

500001–500100 

|-bgcolor=#d6d6d6
| 500001 ||  || — || August 1, 2011 || Haleakala || Pan-STARRS || EOS || align=right | 2.0 km || 
|-id=002 bgcolor=#d6d6d6
| 500002 ||  || — || August 6, 2011 || Haleakala || Pan-STARRS ||  || align=right | 2.4 km || 
|-id=003 bgcolor=#d6d6d6
| 500003 ||  || — || November 15, 2006 || Mount Lemmon || Mount Lemmon Survey ||  || align=right | 2.3 km || 
|-id=004 bgcolor=#d6d6d6
| 500004 ||  || — || August 2, 2011 || Haleakala || Pan-STARRS || VER || align=right | 2.9 km || 
|-id=005 bgcolor=#d6d6d6
| 500005 ||  || — || December 5, 2007 || Mount Lemmon || Mount Lemmon Survey || LUT || align=right | 3.2 km || 
|-id=006 bgcolor=#d6d6d6
| 500006 ||  || — || September 17, 2006 || Kitt Peak || Spacewatch ||  || align=right | 2.2 km || 
|-id=007 bgcolor=#d6d6d6
| 500007 ||  || — || August 20, 2011 || Haleakala || Pan-STARRS || TIR || align=right | 2.1 km || 
|-id=008 bgcolor=#d6d6d6
| 500008 ||  || — || June 12, 2011 || Mount Lemmon || Mount Lemmon Survey ||  || align=right | 3.3 km || 
|-id=009 bgcolor=#d6d6d6
| 500009 ||  || — || July 6, 2005 || Siding Spring || SSS ||  || align=right | 2.9 km || 
|-id=010 bgcolor=#d6d6d6
| 500010 ||  || — || October 19, 2006 || Mount Lemmon || Mount Lemmon Survey ||  || align=right | 2.4 km || 
|-id=011 bgcolor=#d6d6d6
| 500011 ||  || — || August 20, 2011 || Haleakala || Pan-STARRS || EUP || align=right | 3.1 km || 
|-id=012 bgcolor=#d6d6d6
| 500012 ||  || — || August 24, 2011 || Haleakala || Pan-STARRS ||  || align=right | 3.0 km || 
|-id=013 bgcolor=#d6d6d6
| 500013 ||  || — || March 25, 2003 || Kitt Peak || Spacewatch || EUP || align=right | 3.7 km || 
|-id=014 bgcolor=#d6d6d6
| 500014 ||  || — || May 31, 2010 || WISE || WISE || Tj (2.97) || align=right | 3.2 km || 
|-id=015 bgcolor=#d6d6d6
| 500015 ||  || — || October 1, 2000 || Socorro || LINEAR ||  || align=right | 3.5 km || 
|-id=016 bgcolor=#d6d6d6
| 500016 ||  || — || August 30, 2011 || Haleakala || Pan-STARRS || EOS || align=right | 2.0 km || 
|-id=017 bgcolor=#d6d6d6
| 500017 ||  || — || October 1, 2000 || Socorro || LINEAR ||  || align=right | 3.2 km || 
|-id=018 bgcolor=#d6d6d6
| 500018 ||  || — || August 24, 2011 || Haleakala || Pan-STARRS || TRE || align=right | 2.4 km || 
|-id=019 bgcolor=#d6d6d6
| 500019 ||  || — || August 23, 2011 || Haleakala || Pan-STARRS ||  || align=right | 3.2 km || 
|-id=020 bgcolor=#d6d6d6
| 500020 ||  || — || February 2, 2008 || Mount Lemmon || Mount Lemmon Survey || VER || align=right | 2.2 km || 
|-id=021 bgcolor=#d6d6d6
| 500021 ||  || — || June 10, 2011 || Mount Lemmon || Mount Lemmon Survey || VER || align=right | 3.3 km || 
|-id=022 bgcolor=#d6d6d6
| 500022 ||  || — || August 31, 2011 || Haleakala || Pan-STARRS || URS || align=right | 4.0 km || 
|-id=023 bgcolor=#d6d6d6
| 500023 ||  || — || September 4, 2011 || Haleakala || Pan-STARRS || EOS || align=right | 1.8 km || 
|-id=024 bgcolor=#d6d6d6
| 500024 ||  || — || May 13, 2010 || Kitt Peak || Spacewatch ||  || align=right | 2.4 km || 
|-id=025 bgcolor=#d6d6d6
| 500025 ||  || — || September 2, 2011 || Haleakala || Pan-STARRS || EOS || align=right | 1.8 km || 
|-id=026 bgcolor=#FA8072
| 500026 ||  || — || September 18, 2011 || Mount Lemmon || Mount Lemmon Survey ||  || align=right data-sort-value="0.85" | 850 m || 
|-id=027 bgcolor=#d6d6d6
| 500027 ||  || — || October 29, 2005 || Kitt Peak || Spacewatch || 7:4 || align=right | 2.8 km || 
|-id=028 bgcolor=#d6d6d6
| 500028 ||  || — || September 20, 2011 || Kitt Peak || Spacewatch || Tj (2.97) || align=right | 3.2 km || 
|-id=029 bgcolor=#d6d6d6
| 500029 ||  || — || February 12, 2008 || Mount Lemmon || Mount Lemmon Survey || URS || align=right | 3.3 km || 
|-id=030 bgcolor=#fefefe
| 500030 ||  || — || September 2, 2011 || Haleakala || Pan-STARRS ||  || align=right data-sort-value="0.44" | 440 m || 
|-id=031 bgcolor=#d6d6d6
| 500031 ||  || — || March 3, 2009 || Kitt Peak || Spacewatch || VER || align=right | 2.3 km || 
|-id=032 bgcolor=#d6d6d6
| 500032 ||  || — || August 30, 2011 || La Sagra || OAM Obs. ||  || align=right | 3.2 km || 
|-id=033 bgcolor=#d6d6d6
| 500033 ||  || — || September 4, 2011 || Kitt Peak || Spacewatch ||  || align=right | 3.1 km || 
|-id=034 bgcolor=#fefefe
| 500034 ||  || — || September 20, 2011 || Mount Lemmon || Mount Lemmon Survey ||  || align=right data-sort-value="0.64" | 640 m || 
|-id=035 bgcolor=#d6d6d6
| 500035 ||  || — || August 4, 2011 || La Sagra || OAM Obs. ||  || align=right | 3.0 km || 
|-id=036 bgcolor=#d6d6d6
| 500036 ||  || — || June 9, 2011 || Haleakala || Pan-STARRS ||  || align=right | 3.3 km || 
|-id=037 bgcolor=#d6d6d6
| 500037 ||  || — || March 19, 2010 || Mount Lemmon || Mount Lemmon Survey || Tj (2.98) || align=right | 3.3 km || 
|-id=038 bgcolor=#d6d6d6
| 500038 ||  || — || March 11, 2008 || Mount Lemmon || Mount Lemmon Survey ||  || align=right | 2.7 km || 
|-id=039 bgcolor=#d6d6d6
| 500039 ||  || — || September 26, 2011 || Haleakala || Pan-STARRS ||  || align=right | 3.2 km || 
|-id=040 bgcolor=#d6d6d6
| 500040 ||  || — || September 26, 2011 || Haleakala || Pan-STARRS ||  || align=right | 3.0 km || 
|-id=041 bgcolor=#d6d6d6
| 500041 ||  || — || October 4, 1994 || Kitt Peak || Spacewatch ||  || align=right | 2.4 km || 
|-id=042 bgcolor=#d6d6d6
| 500042 ||  || — || September 4, 2011 || Haleakala || Pan-STARRS ||  || align=right | 3.0 km || 
|-id=043 bgcolor=#d6d6d6
| 500043 ||  || — || July 14, 2010 || WISE || WISE || EUP || align=right | 2.8 km || 
|-id=044 bgcolor=#d6d6d6
| 500044 ||  || — || August 23, 2011 || Haleakala || Pan-STARRS ||  || align=right | 3.1 km || 
|-id=045 bgcolor=#d6d6d6
| 500045 ||  || — || October 25, 2005 || Kitt Peak || Spacewatch || 7:4 || align=right | 3.7 km || 
|-id=046 bgcolor=#fefefe
| 500046 ||  || — || September 30, 2011 || Kitt Peak || Spacewatch ||  || align=right data-sort-value="0.45" | 450 m || 
|-id=047 bgcolor=#d6d6d6
| 500047 ||  || — || February 26, 2009 || Mount Lemmon || Mount Lemmon Survey || ALA || align=right | 2.6 km || 
|-id=048 bgcolor=#d6d6d6
| 500048 ||  || — || September 23, 2011 || Catalina || CSS || EUP || align=right | 4.1 km || 
|-id=049 bgcolor=#fefefe
| 500049 ||  || — || September 23, 2011 || Mount Lemmon || Mount Lemmon Survey ||  || align=right data-sort-value="0.54" | 540 m || 
|-id=050 bgcolor=#fefefe
| 500050 ||  || — || October 27, 2008 || Kitt Peak || Spacewatch ||  || align=right data-sort-value="0.36" | 360 m || 
|-id=051 bgcolor=#fefefe
| 500051 ||  || — || October 18, 2011 || Mount Lemmon || Mount Lemmon Survey ||  || align=right data-sort-value="0.58" | 580 m || 
|-id=052 bgcolor=#E9E9E9
| 500052 ||  || — || November 14, 2007 || Kitt Peak || Spacewatch ||  || align=right data-sort-value="0.82" | 820 m || 
|-id=053 bgcolor=#d6d6d6
| 500053 ||  || — || September 29, 2005 || Mount Lemmon || Mount Lemmon Survey || 7:4 || align=right | 2.9 km || 
|-id=054 bgcolor=#fefefe
| 500054 ||  || — || December 10, 2005 || Kitt Peak || Spacewatch ||  || align=right data-sort-value="0.65" | 650 m || 
|-id=055 bgcolor=#d6d6d6
| 500055 ||  || — || October 24, 2011 || Haleakala || Pan-STARRS || 7:4 || align=right | 3.4 km || 
|-id=056 bgcolor=#d6d6d6
| 500056 ||  || — || September 26, 2011 || Haleakala || Pan-STARRS || EOS || align=right | 2.1 km || 
|-id=057 bgcolor=#fefefe
| 500057 ||  || — || December 2, 2005 || Mount Lemmon || Mount Lemmon Survey ||  || align=right data-sort-value="0.64" | 640 m || 
|-id=058 bgcolor=#d6d6d6
| 500058 ||  || — || February 13, 2008 || Kitt Peak || Spacewatch ||  || align=right | 3.2 km || 
|-id=059 bgcolor=#d6d6d6
| 500059 ||  || — || October 25, 2011 || Haleakala || Pan-STARRS ||  || align=right | 4.1 km || 
|-id=060 bgcolor=#fefefe
| 500060 ||  || — || October 26, 2011 || Haleakala || Pan-STARRS ||  || align=right data-sort-value="0.67" | 670 m || 
|-id=061 bgcolor=#fefefe
| 500061 ||  || — || October 24, 2011 || Haleakala || Pan-STARRS ||  || align=right data-sort-value="0.59" | 590 m || 
|-id=062 bgcolor=#d6d6d6
| 500062 ||  || — || October 3, 2005 || Catalina || CSS || 7:4 || align=right | 4.1 km || 
|-id=063 bgcolor=#d6d6d6
| 500063 ||  || — || January 20, 2008 || Kitt Peak || Spacewatch || URS || align=right | 3.8 km || 
|-id=064 bgcolor=#fefefe
| 500064 ||  || — || October 23, 2011 || Mount Lemmon || Mount Lemmon Survey ||  || align=right data-sort-value="0.52" | 520 m || 
|-id=065 bgcolor=#fefefe
| 500065 ||  || — || October 18, 2011 || Kitt Peak || Spacewatch ||  || align=right data-sort-value="0.54" | 540 m || 
|-id=066 bgcolor=#fefefe
| 500066 ||  || — || January 6, 2006 || Mount Lemmon || Mount Lemmon Survey ||  || align=right data-sort-value="0.52" | 520 m || 
|-id=067 bgcolor=#fefefe
| 500067 ||  || — || October 25, 2011 || Haleakala || Pan-STARRS ||  || align=right data-sort-value="0.57" | 570 m || 
|-id=068 bgcolor=#d6d6d6
| 500068 ||  || — || September 25, 2011 || Haleakala || Pan-STARRS ||  || align=right | 3.5 km || 
|-id=069 bgcolor=#d6d6d6
| 500069 ||  || — || September 25, 2011 || Haleakala || Pan-STARRS || HYG || align=right | 2.5 km || 
|-id=070 bgcolor=#fefefe
| 500070 ||  || — || December 25, 2005 || Kitt Peak || Spacewatch ||  || align=right data-sort-value="0.49" | 490 m || 
|-id=071 bgcolor=#d6d6d6
| 500071 ||  || — || October 18, 2011 || Mount Lemmon || Mount Lemmon Survey || EOS || align=right | 3.3 km || 
|-id=072 bgcolor=#fefefe
| 500072 ||  || — || November 18, 2011 || Mount Lemmon || Mount Lemmon Survey ||  || align=right data-sort-value="0.69" | 690 m || 
|-id=073 bgcolor=#d6d6d6
| 500073 ||  || — || October 26, 2011 || Haleakala || Pan-STARRS ||  || align=right | 4.0 km || 
|-id=074 bgcolor=#fefefe
| 500074 ||  || — || October 26, 2011 || Haleakala || Pan-STARRS ||  || align=right data-sort-value="0.87" | 870 m || 
|-id=075 bgcolor=#fefefe
| 500075 ||  || — || November 17, 2011 || Kitt Peak || Spacewatch ||  || align=right data-sort-value="0.50" | 500 m || 
|-id=076 bgcolor=#fefefe
| 500076 ||  || — || October 26, 2011 || Haleakala || Pan-STARRS ||  || align=right data-sort-value="0.86" | 860 m || 
|-id=077 bgcolor=#fefefe
| 500077 ||  || — || October 1, 2011 || Mount Lemmon || Mount Lemmon Survey ||  || align=right data-sort-value="0.64" | 640 m || 
|-id=078 bgcolor=#fefefe
| 500078 ||  || — || November 25, 2011 || Haleakala || Pan-STARRS ||  || align=right data-sort-value="0.62" | 620 m || 
|-id=079 bgcolor=#fefefe
| 500079 ||  || — || December 22, 2008 || Kitt Peak || Spacewatch ||  || align=right data-sort-value="0.70" | 700 m || 
|-id=080 bgcolor=#FFC2E0
| 500080 ||  || — || November 30, 2011 || Catalina || CSS || APO +1kmPHA || align=right | 1.3 km || 
|-id=081 bgcolor=#fefefe
| 500081 ||  || — || November 24, 2011 || Kitt Peak || Spacewatch ||  || align=right data-sort-value="0.62" | 620 m || 
|-id=082 bgcolor=#fefefe
| 500082 ||  || — || November 17, 2011 || Mount Lemmon || Mount Lemmon Survey ||  || align=right | 1.00 km || 
|-id=083 bgcolor=#fefefe
| 500083 ||  || — || November 27, 2011 || Mount Lemmon || Mount Lemmon Survey ||  || align=right data-sort-value="0.83" | 830 m || 
|-id=084 bgcolor=#fefefe
| 500084 ||  || — || December 25, 2011 || Kitt Peak || Spacewatch ||  || align=right data-sort-value="0.49" | 490 m || 
|-id=085 bgcolor=#fefefe
| 500085 ||  || — || December 26, 2011 || Kitt Peak || Spacewatch ||  || align=right data-sort-value="0.56" | 560 m || 
|-id=086 bgcolor=#fefefe
| 500086 ||  || — || December 27, 2011 || Kitt Peak || Spacewatch ||  || align=right data-sort-value="0.79" | 790 m || 
|-id=087 bgcolor=#fefefe
| 500087 ||  || — || December 29, 2011 || Kitt Peak || Spacewatch ||  || align=right data-sort-value="0.72" | 720 m || 
|-id=088 bgcolor=#fefefe
| 500088 ||  || — || December 31, 2011 || Kitt Peak || Spacewatch ||  || align=right data-sort-value="0.77" | 770 m || 
|-id=089 bgcolor=#fefefe
| 500089 ||  || — || December 30, 2011 || Kitt Peak || Spacewatch ||  || align=right data-sort-value="0.63" | 630 m || 
|-id=090 bgcolor=#d6d6d6
| 500090 ||  || — || December 30, 2005 || Mount Lemmon || Mount Lemmon Survey || TIR || align=right | 4.5 km || 
|-id=091 bgcolor=#fefefe
| 500091 ||  || — || December 16, 2004 || Catalina || CSS ||  || align=right | 1.2 km || 
|-id=092 bgcolor=#E9E9E9
| 500092 ||  || — || February 10, 2008 || Catalina || CSS || BAR || align=right | 1.8 km || 
|-id=093 bgcolor=#fefefe
| 500093 ||  || — || January 11, 2008 || Kitt Peak || Spacewatch ||  || align=right data-sort-value="0.64" | 640 m || 
|-id=094 bgcolor=#FFC2E0
| 500094 ||  || — || January 21, 2012 || Catalina || CSS || APO || align=right data-sort-value="0.63" | 630 m || 
|-id=095 bgcolor=#fefefe
| 500095 ||  || — || November 28, 2011 || Mount Lemmon || Mount Lemmon Survey ||  || align=right data-sort-value="0.77" | 770 m || 
|-id=096 bgcolor=#fefefe
| 500096 ||  || — || January 19, 2012 || Kitt Peak || Spacewatch ||  || align=right data-sort-value="0.64" | 640 m || 
|-id=097 bgcolor=#fefefe
| 500097 ||  || — || January 2, 2012 || Mount Lemmon || Mount Lemmon Survey ||  || align=right data-sort-value="0.64" | 640 m || 
|-id=098 bgcolor=#fefefe
| 500098 ||  || — || January 1, 2012 || Mount Lemmon || Mount Lemmon Survey ||  || align=right data-sort-value="0.71" | 710 m || 
|-id=099 bgcolor=#fefefe
| 500099 ||  || — || September 13, 2007 || Kitt Peak || Spacewatch ||  || align=right data-sort-value="0.65" | 650 m || 
|-id=100 bgcolor=#fefefe
| 500100 ||  || — || September 2, 2010 || Mount Lemmon || Mount Lemmon Survey ||  || align=right data-sort-value="0.56" | 560 m || 
|}

500101–500200 

|-bgcolor=#fefefe
| 500101 ||  || — || January 25, 2012 || Haleakala || Pan-STARRS ||  || align=right data-sort-value="0.71" | 710 m || 
|-id=102 bgcolor=#fefefe
| 500102 ||  || — || January 21, 2012 || Kitt Peak || Spacewatch || MAS || align=right data-sort-value="0.58" | 580 m || 
|-id=103 bgcolor=#fefefe
| 500103 ||  || — || January 21, 2012 || Haleakala || Pan-STARRS ||  || align=right | 1.1 km || 
|-id=104 bgcolor=#fefefe
| 500104 ||  || — || May 10, 2005 || Kitt Peak || Spacewatch ||  || align=right data-sort-value="0.78" | 780 m || 
|-id=105 bgcolor=#fefefe
| 500105 ||  || — || January 26, 2012 || Haleakala || Pan-STARRS ||  || align=right data-sort-value="0.61" | 610 m || 
|-id=106 bgcolor=#fefefe
| 500106 ||  || — || January 26, 2012 || Haleakala || Pan-STARRS ||  || align=right data-sort-value="0.75" | 750 m || 
|-id=107 bgcolor=#fefefe
| 500107 ||  || — || April 21, 2009 || Kitt Peak || Spacewatch || V || align=right data-sort-value="0.64" | 640 m || 
|-id=108 bgcolor=#fefefe
| 500108 ||  || — || January 26, 2012 || Mount Lemmon || Mount Lemmon Survey ||  || align=right data-sort-value="0.66" | 660 m || 
|-id=109 bgcolor=#fefefe
| 500109 ||  || — || January 27, 2012 || Mount Lemmon || Mount Lemmon Survey ||  || align=right data-sort-value="0.65" | 650 m || 
|-id=110 bgcolor=#fefefe
| 500110 ||  || — || January 19, 2012 || Kitt Peak || Spacewatch ||  || align=right data-sort-value="0.60" | 600 m || 
|-id=111 bgcolor=#fefefe
| 500111 ||  || — || September 13, 2007 || Mount Lemmon || Mount Lemmon Survey ||  || align=right data-sort-value="0.55" | 550 m || 
|-id=112 bgcolor=#fefefe
| 500112 ||  || — || January 27, 2012 || Kitt Peak || Spacewatch ||  || align=right data-sort-value="0.90" | 900 m || 
|-id=113 bgcolor=#fefefe
| 500113 ||  || — || January 27, 2012 || Kitt Peak || Spacewatch ||  || align=right data-sort-value="0.59" | 590 m || 
|-id=114 bgcolor=#fefefe
| 500114 ||  || — || January 27, 2012 || Mount Lemmon || Mount Lemmon Survey ||  || align=right data-sort-value="0.66" | 660 m || 
|-id=115 bgcolor=#fefefe
| 500115 ||  || — || April 10, 2005 || Mount Lemmon || Mount Lemmon Survey || MAS || align=right data-sort-value="0.61" | 610 m || 
|-id=116 bgcolor=#fefefe
| 500116 ||  || — || January 20, 2012 || Kitt Peak || Spacewatch || MAS || align=right data-sort-value="0.50" | 500 m || 
|-id=117 bgcolor=#fefefe
| 500117 ||  || — || January 21, 2012 || Kitt Peak || Spacewatch || V || align=right data-sort-value="0.48" | 480 m || 
|-id=118 bgcolor=#fefefe
| 500118 ||  || — || January 19, 2012 || Kitt Peak || Spacewatch ||  || align=right data-sort-value="0.55" | 550 m || 
|-id=119 bgcolor=#fefefe
| 500119 ||  || — || November 17, 2004 || Campo Imperatore || CINEOS ||  || align=right data-sort-value="0.50" | 500 m || 
|-id=120 bgcolor=#fefefe
| 500120 ||  || — || January 29, 2012 || Kitt Peak || Spacewatch || V || align=right data-sort-value="0.52" | 520 m || 
|-id=121 bgcolor=#fefefe
| 500121 ||  || — || January 19, 2012 || Haleakala || Pan-STARRS ||  || align=right data-sort-value="0.65" | 650 m || 
|-id=122 bgcolor=#fefefe
| 500122 ||  || — || September 13, 2007 || Mount Lemmon || Mount Lemmon Survey ||  || align=right data-sort-value="0.53" | 530 m || 
|-id=123 bgcolor=#fefefe
| 500123 ||  || — || January 19, 2012 || Kitt Peak || Spacewatch ||  || align=right data-sort-value="0.60" | 600 m || 
|-id=124 bgcolor=#fefefe
| 500124 ||  || — || January 18, 2008 || Kitt Peak || Spacewatch ||  || align=right | 1.0 km || 
|-id=125 bgcolor=#fefefe
| 500125 ||  || — || February 9, 2005 || Mount Lemmon || Mount Lemmon Survey ||  || align=right data-sort-value="0.54" | 540 m || 
|-id=126 bgcolor=#fefefe
| 500126 ||  || — || February 3, 2012 || Haleakala || Pan-STARRS || NYS || align=right data-sort-value="0.61" | 610 m || 
|-id=127 bgcolor=#fefefe
| 500127 ||  || — || January 16, 2005 || Kitt Peak || Spacewatch ||  || align=right data-sort-value="0.57" | 570 m || 
|-id=128 bgcolor=#fefefe
| 500128 ||  || — || February 13, 2012 || Haleakala || Pan-STARRS ||  || align=right data-sort-value="0.90" | 900 m || 
|-id=129 bgcolor=#fefefe
| 500129 ||  || — || January 18, 2012 || Kitt Peak || Spacewatch ||  || align=right data-sort-value="0.72" | 720 m || 
|-id=130 bgcolor=#fefefe
| 500130 ||  || — || January 18, 2012 || Kitt Peak || Spacewatch ||  || align=right data-sort-value="0.64" | 640 m || 
|-id=131 bgcolor=#E9E9E9
| 500131 ||  || — || April 26, 2008 || Mount Lemmon || Mount Lemmon Survey ||  || align=right | 1.3 km || 
|-id=132 bgcolor=#fefefe
| 500132 ||  || — || November 9, 2007 || Mount Lemmon || Mount Lemmon Survey ||  || align=right data-sort-value="0.60" | 600 m || 
|-id=133 bgcolor=#fefefe
| 500133 ||  || — || September 12, 2007 || Mount Lemmon || Mount Lemmon Survey ||  || align=right data-sort-value="0.62" | 620 m || 
|-id=134 bgcolor=#fefefe
| 500134 ||  || — || September 12, 2007 || Kitt Peak || Spacewatch ||  || align=right data-sort-value="0.55" | 550 m || 
|-id=135 bgcolor=#fefefe
| 500135 ||  || — || February 4, 2012 || Haleakala || Pan-STARRS ||  || align=right data-sort-value="0.70" | 700 m || 
|-id=136 bgcolor=#FFC2E0
| 500136 ||  || — || February 15, 2012 || Haleakala || Pan-STARRS || AMOcritical || align=right data-sort-value="0.10" | 100 m || 
|-id=137 bgcolor=#fefefe
| 500137 ||  || — || January 19, 2012 || Haleakala || Pan-STARRS ||  || align=right data-sort-value="0.71" | 710 m || 
|-id=138 bgcolor=#fefefe
| 500138 ||  || — || February 14, 2012 || Haleakala || Pan-STARRS || H || align=right data-sort-value="0.99" | 990 m || 
|-id=139 bgcolor=#fefefe
| 500139 ||  || — || March 4, 2005 || Mount Lemmon || Mount Lemmon Survey ||  || align=right data-sort-value="0.59" | 590 m || 
|-id=140 bgcolor=#E9E9E9
| 500140 ||  || — || June 4, 1999 || Catalina || CSS ||  || align=right | 1.3 km || 
|-id=141 bgcolor=#E9E9E9
| 500141 ||  || — || June 2, 2008 || Mount Lemmon || Mount Lemmon Survey ||  || align=right | 1.3 km || 
|-id=142 bgcolor=#E9E9E9
| 500142 ||  || — || April 10, 2003 || Kitt Peak || Spacewatch ||  || align=right | 2.2 km || 
|-id=143 bgcolor=#E9E9E9
| 500143 ||  || — || February 28, 2008 || Mount Lemmon || Mount Lemmon Survey ||  || align=right | 1.8 km || 
|-id=144 bgcolor=#fefefe
| 500144 ||  || — || February 16, 2012 || Haleakala || Pan-STARRS ||  || align=right data-sort-value="0.67" | 670 m || 
|-id=145 bgcolor=#E9E9E9
| 500145 ||  || — || February 24, 2012 || Haleakala || Pan-STARRS ||  || align=right | 1.1 km || 
|-id=146 bgcolor=#fefefe
| 500146 ||  || — || February 13, 2012 || Kitt Peak || Spacewatch ||  || align=right data-sort-value="0.69" | 690 m || 
|-id=147 bgcolor=#fefefe
| 500147 ||  || — || February 24, 2012 || Kitt Peak || Spacewatch ||  || align=right data-sort-value="0.87" | 870 m || 
|-id=148 bgcolor=#fefefe
| 500148 ||  || — || January 13, 2008 || Kitt Peak || Spacewatch || NYS || align=right data-sort-value="0.53" | 530 m || 
|-id=149 bgcolor=#fefefe
| 500149 ||  || — || March 10, 2005 || Kitt Peak || Spacewatch ||  || align=right data-sort-value="0.70" | 700 m || 
|-id=150 bgcolor=#fefefe
| 500150 ||  || — || December 30, 2011 || Kitt Peak || Spacewatch ||  || align=right data-sort-value="0.81" | 810 m || 
|-id=151 bgcolor=#fefefe
| 500151 ||  || — || January 26, 2012 || Mount Lemmon || Mount Lemmon Survey || LCI || align=right data-sort-value="0.92" | 920 m || 
|-id=152 bgcolor=#d6d6d6
| 500152 ||  || — || February 16, 2012 || Haleakala || Pan-STARRS ||  || align=right | 2.2 km || 
|-id=153 bgcolor=#E9E9E9
| 500153 ||  || — || March 10, 2008 || Kitt Peak || Spacewatch ||  || align=right | 1.2 km || 
|-id=154 bgcolor=#fefefe
| 500154 ||  || — || February 26, 2012 || Haleakala || Pan-STARRS || MAS || align=right data-sort-value="0.66" | 660 m || 
|-id=155 bgcolor=#fefefe
| 500155 ||  || — || February 26, 2012 || Haleakala || Pan-STARRS ||  || align=right data-sort-value="0.75" | 750 m || 
|-id=156 bgcolor=#E9E9E9
| 500156 ||  || — || December 6, 2011 || Haleakala || Pan-STARRS ||  || align=right | 1.6 km || 
|-id=157 bgcolor=#fefefe
| 500157 ||  || — || March 1, 2012 || Mount Lemmon || Mount Lemmon Survey ||  || align=right data-sort-value="0.67" | 670 m || 
|-id=158 bgcolor=#E9E9E9
| 500158 ||  || — || January 18, 2012 || Mount Lemmon || Mount Lemmon Survey ||  || align=right | 1.4 km || 
|-id=159 bgcolor=#fefefe
| 500159 ||  || — || October 14, 2007 || Mount Lemmon || Mount Lemmon Survey ||  || align=right data-sort-value="0.59" | 590 m || 
|-id=160 bgcolor=#fefefe
| 500160 ||  || — || January 20, 2008 || Mount Lemmon || Mount Lemmon Survey ||  || align=right data-sort-value="0.83" | 830 m || 
|-id=161 bgcolor=#fefefe
| 500161 ||  || — || March 4, 2008 || Mount Lemmon || Mount Lemmon Survey ||  || align=right | 1.3 km || 
|-id=162 bgcolor=#fefefe
| 500162 ||  || — || October 12, 2010 || Mount Lemmon || Mount Lemmon Survey ||  || align=right | 1.00 km || 
|-id=163 bgcolor=#fefefe
| 500163 ||  || — || November 18, 2007 || Mount Lemmon || Mount Lemmon Survey ||  || align=right data-sort-value="0.62" | 620 m || 
|-id=164 bgcolor=#fefefe
| 500164 ||  || — || September 4, 2010 || La Sagra || OAM Obs. ||  || align=right data-sort-value="0.77" | 770 m || 
|-id=165 bgcolor=#fefefe
| 500165 ||  || — || December 6, 2011 || Haleakala || Pan-STARRS ||  || align=right data-sort-value="0.85" | 850 m || 
|-id=166 bgcolor=#fefefe
| 500166 ||  || — || March 16, 2012 || Kitt Peak || Spacewatch || NYS || align=right data-sort-value="0.72" | 720 m || 
|-id=167 bgcolor=#fefefe
| 500167 ||  || — || February 8, 2008 || Mount Lemmon || Mount Lemmon Survey || MAS || align=right data-sort-value="0.63" | 630 m || 
|-id=168 bgcolor=#fefefe
| 500168 ||  || — || February 22, 2012 || Kitt Peak || Spacewatch ||  || align=right data-sort-value="0.57" | 570 m || 
|-id=169 bgcolor=#fefefe
| 500169 ||  || — || August 27, 2006 || Kitt Peak || Spacewatch ||  || align=right data-sort-value="0.89" | 890 m || 
|-id=170 bgcolor=#E9E9E9
| 500170 ||  || — || February 26, 2012 || Haleakala || Pan-STARRS || BAR || align=right | 1.4 km || 
|-id=171 bgcolor=#fefefe
| 500171 ||  || — || February 27, 2012 || Haleakala || Pan-STARRS ||  || align=right data-sort-value="0.65" | 650 m || 
|-id=172 bgcolor=#fefefe
| 500172 ||  || — || April 11, 2005 || Mount Lemmon || Mount Lemmon Survey ||  || align=right data-sort-value="0.79" | 790 m || 
|-id=173 bgcolor=#fefefe
| 500173 ||  || — || February 2, 2008 || Mount Lemmon || Mount Lemmon Survey || MAS || align=right data-sort-value="0.60" | 600 m || 
|-id=174 bgcolor=#fefefe
| 500174 ||  || — || December 31, 2007 || Kitt Peak || Spacewatch || MAS || align=right data-sort-value="0.56" | 560 m || 
|-id=175 bgcolor=#fefefe
| 500175 ||  || — || September 12, 2009 || Kitt Peak || Spacewatch ||  || align=right data-sort-value="0.97" | 970 m || 
|-id=176 bgcolor=#fefefe
| 500176 ||  || — || May 10, 2005 || Mount Lemmon || Mount Lemmon Survey || MAS || align=right data-sort-value="0.56" | 560 m || 
|-id=177 bgcolor=#fefefe
| 500177 ||  || — || February 28, 2012 || Haleakala || Pan-STARRS || NYS || align=right data-sort-value="0.59" | 590 m || 
|-id=178 bgcolor=#E9E9E9
| 500178 ||  || — || February 21, 2012 || Kitt Peak || Spacewatch ||  || align=right | 1.6 km || 
|-id=179 bgcolor=#fefefe
| 500179 ||  || — || February 26, 2012 || Kitt Peak || Spacewatch ||  || align=right data-sort-value="0.72" | 720 m || 
|-id=180 bgcolor=#fefefe
| 500180 ||  || — || February 22, 2012 || Kitt Peak || Spacewatch ||  || align=right data-sort-value="0.67" | 670 m || 
|-id=181 bgcolor=#E9E9E9
| 500181 ||  || — || February 28, 2012 || Haleakala || Pan-STARRS ||  || align=right data-sort-value="0.99" | 990 m || 
|-id=182 bgcolor=#fefefe
| 500182 ||  || — || March 15, 2012 || Mount Lemmon || Mount Lemmon Survey ||  || align=right data-sort-value="0.67" | 670 m || 
|-id=183 bgcolor=#E9E9E9
| 500183 ||  || — || February 27, 2012 || Haleakala || Pan-STARRS ||  || align=right | 1.2 km || 
|-id=184 bgcolor=#fefefe
| 500184 ||  || — || September 11, 2010 || Kitt Peak || Spacewatch ||  || align=right data-sort-value="0.77" | 770 m || 
|-id=185 bgcolor=#E9E9E9
| 500185 ||  || — || February 27, 2012 || Kitt Peak || Spacewatch ||  || align=right data-sort-value="0.83" | 830 m || 
|-id=186 bgcolor=#fefefe
| 500186 ||  || — || January 13, 2008 || Kitt Peak || Spacewatch ||  || align=right data-sort-value="0.66" | 660 m || 
|-id=187 bgcolor=#E9E9E9
| 500187 ||  || — || March 15, 2012 || Kitt Peak || Spacewatch ||  || align=right | 1.2 km || 
|-id=188 bgcolor=#E9E9E9
| 500188 ||  || — || April 15, 2012 || Haleakala || Pan-STARRS ||  || align=right | 1.6 km || 
|-id=189 bgcolor=#fefefe
| 500189 ||  || — || January 11, 2008 || Kitt Peak || Spacewatch || MAS || align=right data-sort-value="0.58" | 580 m || 
|-id=190 bgcolor=#fefefe
| 500190 ||  || — || February 28, 2012 || Haleakala || Pan-STARRS || MAS || align=right data-sort-value="0.63" | 630 m || 
|-id=191 bgcolor=#E9E9E9
| 500191 ||  || — || February 24, 2012 || Mount Lemmon || Mount Lemmon Survey ||  || align=right | 1.4 km || 
|-id=192 bgcolor=#E9E9E9
| 500192 ||  || — || April 15, 2012 || Haleakala || Pan-STARRS ||  || align=right | 2.1 km || 
|-id=193 bgcolor=#E9E9E9
| 500193 ||  || — || February 29, 2012 || Mount Lemmon || Mount Lemmon Survey ||  || align=right data-sort-value="0.99" | 990 m || 
|-id=194 bgcolor=#E9E9E9
| 500194 ||  || — || March 24, 2012 || Kitt Peak || Spacewatch ||  || align=right | 1.0 km || 
|-id=195 bgcolor=#E9E9E9
| 500195 ||  || — || October 22, 2009 || Mount Lemmon || Mount Lemmon Survey ||  || align=right | 1.6 km || 
|-id=196 bgcolor=#E9E9E9
| 500196 ||  || — || January 27, 2011 || Mount Lemmon || Mount Lemmon Survey ||  || align=right | 1.5 km || 
|-id=197 bgcolor=#E9E9E9
| 500197 ||  || — || April 16, 2012 || Kitt Peak || Spacewatch ||  || align=right | 1.5 km || 
|-id=198 bgcolor=#E9E9E9
| 500198 ||  || — || July 2, 2008 || Kitt Peak || Spacewatch ||  || align=right | 1.7 km || 
|-id=199 bgcolor=#E9E9E9
| 500199 ||  || — || January 6, 2012 || Haleakala || Pan-STARRS ||  || align=right data-sort-value="0.93" | 930 m || 
|-id=200 bgcolor=#E9E9E9
| 500200 ||  || — || April 15, 2012 || Haleakala || Pan-STARRS || EUN || align=right | 1.5 km || 
|}

500201–500300 

|-bgcolor=#E9E9E9
| 500201 ||  || — || April 15, 2012 || Haleakala || Pan-STARRS ||  || align=right | 1.4 km || 
|-id=202 bgcolor=#E9E9E9
| 500202 ||  || — || May 14, 2008 || Mount Lemmon || Mount Lemmon Survey ||  || align=right data-sort-value="0.75" | 750 m || 
|-id=203 bgcolor=#E9E9E9
| 500203 ||  || — || May 29, 2008 || Mount Lemmon || Mount Lemmon Survey ||  || align=right | 1.4 km || 
|-id=204 bgcolor=#E9E9E9
| 500204 ||  || — || March 12, 2007 || Kitt Peak || Spacewatch ||  || align=right | 1.9 km || 
|-id=205 bgcolor=#E9E9E9
| 500205 ||  || — || February 25, 2012 || Mount Lemmon || Mount Lemmon Survey ||  || align=right | 1.5 km || 
|-id=206 bgcolor=#E9E9E9
| 500206 ||  || — || April 15, 2012 || Haleakala || Pan-STARRS ||  || align=right | 1.4 km || 
|-id=207 bgcolor=#E9E9E9
| 500207 ||  || — || March 29, 2012 || Mount Lemmon || Mount Lemmon Survey ||  || align=right data-sort-value="0.74" | 740 m || 
|-id=208 bgcolor=#E9E9E9
| 500208 ||  || — || April 24, 2012 || Kitt Peak || Spacewatch || KON || align=right data-sort-value="0.81" | 810 m || 
|-id=209 bgcolor=#fefefe
| 500209 ||  || — || December 15, 2007 || Mount Lemmon || Mount Lemmon Survey ||  || align=right data-sort-value="0.70" | 700 m || 
|-id=210 bgcolor=#E9E9E9
| 500210 ||  || — || March 23, 2012 || Mount Lemmon || Mount Lemmon Survey || EUN || align=right | 2.0 km || 
|-id=211 bgcolor=#E9E9E9
| 500211 ||  || — || April 28, 2004 || Kitt Peak || Spacewatch ||  || align=right data-sort-value="0.91" | 910 m || 
|-id=212 bgcolor=#E9E9E9
| 500212 ||  || — || March 27, 2012 || Kitt Peak || Spacewatch ||  || align=right | 1.2 km || 
|-id=213 bgcolor=#E9E9E9
| 500213 ||  || — || January 27, 2007 || Kitt Peak || Spacewatch ||  || align=right | 1.8 km || 
|-id=214 bgcolor=#fefefe
| 500214 ||  || — || December 31, 2007 || Kitt Peak || Spacewatch || NYS || align=right data-sort-value="0.64" | 640 m || 
|-id=215 bgcolor=#E9E9E9
| 500215 ||  || — || March 27, 2012 || Kitt Peak || Spacewatch ||  || align=right | 1.1 km || 
|-id=216 bgcolor=#fefefe
| 500216 ||  || — || March 31, 2008 || Mount Lemmon || Mount Lemmon Survey ||  || align=right | 1.1 km || 
|-id=217 bgcolor=#E9E9E9
| 500217 ||  || — || April 21, 2012 || Haleakala || Pan-STARRS ||  || align=right | 1.4 km || 
|-id=218 bgcolor=#fefefe
| 500218 ||  || — || April 15, 2012 || Haleakala || Pan-STARRS ||  || align=right data-sort-value="0.83" | 830 m || 
|-id=219 bgcolor=#E9E9E9
| 500219 ||  || — || April 21, 2012 || Haleakala || Pan-STARRS ||  || align=right | 1.6 km || 
|-id=220 bgcolor=#E9E9E9
| 500220 ||  || — || January 6, 2012 || Haleakala || Pan-STARRS ||  || align=right | 1.7 km || 
|-id=221 bgcolor=#E9E9E9
| 500221 ||  || — || March 28, 2012 || Kitt Peak || Spacewatch || EUN || align=right | 1.1 km || 
|-id=222 bgcolor=#E9E9E9
| 500222 ||  || — || October 26, 2009 || La Sagra || OAM Obs. ||  || align=right | 1.4 km || 
|-id=223 bgcolor=#E9E9E9
| 500223 ||  || — || April 22, 2012 || Kitt Peak || Spacewatch ||  || align=right | 1.9 km || 
|-id=224 bgcolor=#E9E9E9
| 500224 ||  || — || April 29, 2008 || Mount Lemmon || Mount Lemmon Survey ||  || align=right data-sort-value="0.71" | 710 m || 
|-id=225 bgcolor=#E9E9E9
| 500225 ||  || — || April 29, 2012 || Mount Lemmon || Mount Lemmon Survey ||  || align=right data-sort-value="0.81" | 810 m || 
|-id=226 bgcolor=#E9E9E9
| 500226 ||  || — || August 8, 2008 || La Sagra || OAM Obs. ||  || align=right | 1.3 km || 
|-id=227 bgcolor=#E9E9E9
| 500227 ||  || — || April 29, 2012 || Catalina || CSS || BAR || align=right data-sort-value="0.83" | 830 m || 
|-id=228 bgcolor=#E9E9E9
| 500228 ||  || — || April 18, 2012 || Kitt Peak || Spacewatch ||  || align=right data-sort-value="0.83" | 830 m || 
|-id=229 bgcolor=#E9E9E9
| 500229 ||  || — || April 29, 2012 || Kitt Peak || Spacewatch || KON || align=right | 2.1 km || 
|-id=230 bgcolor=#E9E9E9
| 500230 ||  || — || May 28, 2008 || Mount Lemmon || Mount Lemmon Survey ||  || align=right data-sort-value="0.75" | 750 m || 
|-id=231 bgcolor=#E9E9E9
| 500231 ||  || — || April 20, 2012 || Kitt Peak || Spacewatch ||  || align=right | 1.1 km || 
|-id=232 bgcolor=#E9E9E9
| 500232 ||  || — || April 17, 2012 || Kitt Peak || Spacewatch ||  || align=right | 1.0 km || 
|-id=233 bgcolor=#E9E9E9
| 500233 ||  || — || April 21, 2012 || Mount Lemmon || Mount Lemmon Survey ||  || align=right | 1.2 km || 
|-id=234 bgcolor=#E9E9E9
| 500234 ||  || — || January 30, 2011 || Haleakala || Pan-STARRS ||  || align=right | 1.1 km || 
|-id=235 bgcolor=#E9E9E9
| 500235 ||  || — || January 30, 2011 || Haleakala || Pan-STARRS || TIN || align=right data-sort-value="0.84" | 840 m || 
|-id=236 bgcolor=#E9E9E9
| 500236 ||  || — || April 15, 2012 || Haleakala || Pan-STARRS || MAR || align=right data-sort-value="0.87" | 870 m || 
|-id=237 bgcolor=#E9E9E9
| 500237 ||  || — || April 30, 2012 || Mount Lemmon || Mount Lemmon Survey ||  || align=right | 1.1 km || 
|-id=238 bgcolor=#E9E9E9
| 500238 ||  || — || May 12, 2012 || Siding Spring || SSS ||  || align=right | 1.5 km || 
|-id=239 bgcolor=#fefefe
| 500239 ||  || — || April 28, 2012 || Mount Lemmon || Mount Lemmon Survey ||  || align=right data-sort-value="0.85" | 850 m || 
|-id=240 bgcolor=#E9E9E9
| 500240 ||  || — || March 28, 2012 || Mount Lemmon || Mount Lemmon Survey ||  || align=right | 1.3 km || 
|-id=241 bgcolor=#E9E9E9
| 500241 ||  || — || April 29, 2008 || Mount Lemmon || Mount Lemmon Survey || BAR || align=right | 2.5 km || 
|-id=242 bgcolor=#E9E9E9
| 500242 ||  || — || April 27, 2012 || Haleakala || Pan-STARRS ||  || align=right | 1.3 km || 
|-id=243 bgcolor=#E9E9E9
| 500243 ||  || — || April 16, 2012 || Kitt Peak || Spacewatch || ADE || align=right | 1.2 km || 
|-id=244 bgcolor=#E9E9E9
| 500244 ||  || — || May 1, 2012 || Mount Lemmon || Mount Lemmon Survey ||  || align=right | 1.0 km || 
|-id=245 bgcolor=#E9E9E9
| 500245 ||  || — || October 2, 2008 || Mount Lemmon || Mount Lemmon Survey ||  || align=right | 1.6 km || 
|-id=246 bgcolor=#E9E9E9
| 500246 ||  || — || October 31, 2005 || Mount Lemmon || Mount Lemmon Survey ||  || align=right | 1.4 km || 
|-id=247 bgcolor=#E9E9E9
| 500247 ||  || — || April 17, 2012 || Kitt Peak || Spacewatch ||  || align=right data-sort-value="0.76" | 760 m || 
|-id=248 bgcolor=#E9E9E9
| 500248 ||  || — || April 17, 2012 || Kitt Peak || Spacewatch ||  || align=right | 1.5 km || 
|-id=249 bgcolor=#E9E9E9
| 500249 ||  || — || May 15, 2012 || Haleakala || Pan-STARRS ||  || align=right | 1.3 km || 
|-id=250 bgcolor=#E9E9E9
| 500250 ||  || — || January 30, 2011 || Haleakala || Pan-STARRS || NEM || align=right | 1.9 km || 
|-id=251 bgcolor=#fefefe
| 500251 ||  || — || April 1, 2008 || Kitt Peak || Spacewatch ||  || align=right data-sort-value="0.76" | 760 m || 
|-id=252 bgcolor=#E9E9E9
| 500252 ||  || — || April 21, 2012 || Mount Lemmon || Mount Lemmon Survey ||  || align=right data-sort-value="0.89" | 890 m || 
|-id=253 bgcolor=#E9E9E9
| 500253 ||  || — || April 15, 2012 || Haleakala || Pan-STARRS ||  || align=right | 1.2 km || 
|-id=254 bgcolor=#E9E9E9
| 500254 ||  || — || January 10, 2011 || Mount Lemmon || Mount Lemmon Survey ||  || align=right | 1.7 km || 
|-id=255 bgcolor=#E9E9E9
| 500255 ||  || — || April 28, 2012 || Mount Lemmon || Mount Lemmon Survey ||  || align=right data-sort-value="0.89" | 890 m || 
|-id=256 bgcolor=#E9E9E9
| 500256 ||  || — || May 16, 2012 || Mount Lemmon || Mount Lemmon Survey ||  || align=right | 2.0 km || 
|-id=257 bgcolor=#E9E9E9
| 500257 ||  || — || January 30, 2011 || Haleakala || Pan-STARRS ||  || align=right | 2.1 km || 
|-id=258 bgcolor=#E9E9E9
| 500258 ||  || — || May 20, 2012 || Mount Lemmon || Mount Lemmon Survey || EUN || align=right | 1.8 km || 
|-id=259 bgcolor=#E9E9E9
| 500259 ||  || — || May 29, 2012 || Mount Lemmon || Mount Lemmon Survey ||  || align=right | 1.4 km || 
|-id=260 bgcolor=#E9E9E9
| 500260 ||  || — || May 15, 2012 || Haleakala || Pan-STARRS || ADE || align=right | 1.7 km || 
|-id=261 bgcolor=#E9E9E9
| 500261 ||  || — || May 31, 2012 || Mount Lemmon || Mount Lemmon Survey ||  || align=right | 1.1 km || 
|-id=262 bgcolor=#E9E9E9
| 500262 ||  || — || May 15, 2012 || Haleakala || Pan-STARRS ||  || align=right | 1.0 km || 
|-id=263 bgcolor=#E9E9E9
| 500263 ||  || — || May 14, 2012 || Haleakala || Pan-STARRS ||  || align=right | 1.4 km || 
|-id=264 bgcolor=#E9E9E9
| 500264 ||  || — || January 30, 2011 || Haleakala || Pan-STARRS ||  || align=right | 2.0 km || 
|-id=265 bgcolor=#E9E9E9
| 500265 ||  || — || June 14, 2012 || Mount Lemmon || Mount Lemmon Survey ||  || align=right | 1.1 km || 
|-id=266 bgcolor=#E9E9E9
| 500266 ||  || — || May 15, 2012 || Haleakala || Pan-STARRS ||  || align=right | 1.3 km || 
|-id=267 bgcolor=#E9E9E9
| 500267 ||  || — || May 16, 2012 || Haleakala || Pan-STARRS || EUN || align=right data-sort-value="0.88" | 880 m || 
|-id=268 bgcolor=#E9E9E9
| 500268 ||  || — || January 30, 2011 || Haleakala || Pan-STARRS ||  || align=right | 1.9 km || 
|-id=269 bgcolor=#E9E9E9
| 500269 ||  || — || May 21, 2012 || Haleakala || Pan-STARRS ||  || align=right | 1.9 km || 
|-id=270 bgcolor=#E9E9E9
| 500270 ||  || — || May 15, 2012 || Haleakala || Pan-STARRS || EUN || align=right | 1.1 km || 
|-id=271 bgcolor=#E9E9E9
| 500271 ||  || — || May 29, 2012 || Mount Lemmon || Mount Lemmon Survey || EUN || align=right | 1.2 km || 
|-id=272 bgcolor=#E9E9E9
| 500272 ||  || — || May 16, 2012 || Haleakala || Pan-STARRS || HNS || align=right data-sort-value="0.92" | 920 m || 
|-id=273 bgcolor=#E9E9E9
| 500273 ||  || — || June 12, 2012 || Kitt Peak || Spacewatch ||  || align=right | 2.2 km || 
|-id=274 bgcolor=#E9E9E9
| 500274 ||  || — || November 16, 2009 || Mount Lemmon || Mount Lemmon Survey ||  || align=right | 2.0 km || 
|-id=275 bgcolor=#E9E9E9
| 500275 ||  || — || March 6, 2003 || Anderson Mesa || LONEOS || EUN || align=right | 1.4 km || 
|-id=276 bgcolor=#d6d6d6
| 500276 ||  || — || August 8, 2012 || Haleakala || Pan-STARRS ||  || align=right | 2.1 km || 
|-id=277 bgcolor=#d6d6d6
| 500277 ||  || — || August 8, 2012 || Haleakala || Pan-STARRS ||  || align=right | 2.2 km || 
|-id=278 bgcolor=#d6d6d6
| 500278 ||  || — || August 8, 2012 || Haleakala || Pan-STARRS || EMA || align=right | 2.8 km || 
|-id=279 bgcolor=#d6d6d6
| 500279 ||  || — || March 29, 2011 || Mount Lemmon || Mount Lemmon Survey ||  || align=right | 2.7 km || 
|-id=280 bgcolor=#d6d6d6
| 500280 ||  || — || August 9, 2012 || Haleakala || Pan-STARRS ||  || align=right | 2.5 km || 
|-id=281 bgcolor=#d6d6d6
| 500281 ||  || — || August 10, 2012 || Kitt Peak || Spacewatch ||  || align=right | 2.7 km || 
|-id=282 bgcolor=#d6d6d6
| 500282 ||  || — || December 30, 2008 || Mount Lemmon || Mount Lemmon Survey || EOS || align=right | 2.0 km || 
|-id=283 bgcolor=#E9E9E9
| 500283 ||  || — || August 10, 2012 || Kitt Peak || Spacewatch || WAT || align=right | 3.1 km || 
|-id=284 bgcolor=#fefefe
| 500284 ||  || — || February 7, 2006 || Kitt Peak || Spacewatch || H || align=right data-sort-value="0.47" | 470 m || 
|-id=285 bgcolor=#fefefe
| 500285 ||  || — || February 2, 2006 || Kitt Peak || Spacewatch || H || align=right data-sort-value="0.69" | 690 m || 
|-id=286 bgcolor=#FA8072
| 500286 ||  || — || August 11, 2012 || Haleakala || Pan-STARRS || H || align=right data-sort-value="0.85" | 850 m || 
|-id=287 bgcolor=#E9E9E9
| 500287 ||  || — || May 29, 2012 || Mount Lemmon || Mount Lemmon Survey ||  || align=right | 2.6 km || 
|-id=288 bgcolor=#E9E9E9
| 500288 ||  || — || April 24, 2003 || Anderson Mesa || LONEOS ||  || align=right | 1.6 km || 
|-id=289 bgcolor=#d6d6d6
| 500289 ||  || — || August 11, 2012 || Siding Spring || SSS || EMA || align=right | 3.1 km || 
|-id=290 bgcolor=#E9E9E9
| 500290 ||  || — || April 13, 2011 || Mount Lemmon || Mount Lemmon Survey ||  || align=right | 2.3 km || 
|-id=291 bgcolor=#E9E9E9
| 500291 ||  || — || September 5, 2008 || Kitt Peak || Spacewatch ||  || align=right | 1.4 km || 
|-id=292 bgcolor=#d6d6d6
| 500292 ||  || — || September 14, 2007 || Kitt Peak || Spacewatch ||  || align=right | 2.2 km || 
|-id=293 bgcolor=#d6d6d6
| 500293 ||  || — || August 14, 2012 || Haleakala || Pan-STARRS ||  || align=right | 3.0 km || 
|-id=294 bgcolor=#fefefe
| 500294 ||  || — || August 16, 2012 || Haleakala || Pan-STARRS || H || align=right data-sort-value="0.71" | 710 m || 
|-id=295 bgcolor=#E9E9E9
| 500295 ||  || — || March 31, 2011 || Haleakala || Pan-STARRS ||  || align=right | 2.1 km || 
|-id=296 bgcolor=#d6d6d6
| 500296 ||  || — || August 16, 2012 || Haleakala || Pan-STARRS ||  || align=right | 2.7 km || 
|-id=297 bgcolor=#fefefe
| 500297 ||  || — || August 8, 2012 || Haleakala || Pan-STARRS || H || align=right data-sort-value="0.53" | 530 m || 
|-id=298 bgcolor=#d6d6d6
| 500298 ||  || — || August 14, 2012 || Kitt Peak || Spacewatch ||  || align=right | 2.7 km || 
|-id=299 bgcolor=#d6d6d6
| 500299 ||  || — || August 14, 2012 || Kitt Peak || Spacewatch ||  || align=right | 2.1 km || 
|-id=300 bgcolor=#d6d6d6
| 500300 ||  || — || October 8, 2007 || Kitt Peak || Spacewatch || HYG || align=right | 2.4 km || 
|}

500301–500400 

|-bgcolor=#d6d6d6
| 500301 ||  || — || December 31, 2008 || Kitt Peak || Spacewatch ||  || align=right | 2.8 km || 
|-id=302 bgcolor=#d6d6d6
| 500302 ||  || — || August 13, 2012 || Kitt Peak || Spacewatch ||  || align=right | 3.6 km || 
|-id=303 bgcolor=#d6d6d6
| 500303 ||  || — || January 16, 2009 || Kitt Peak || Spacewatch || EOS || align=right | 1.4 km || 
|-id=304 bgcolor=#d6d6d6
| 500304 ||  || — || August 26, 2012 || Haleakala || Pan-STARRS || EOS || align=right | 1.7 km || 
|-id=305 bgcolor=#fefefe
| 500305 ||  || — || January 10, 2011 || Kitt Peak || Spacewatch || H || align=right data-sort-value="0.65" | 650 m || 
|-id=306 bgcolor=#d6d6d6
| 500306 ||  || — || September 9, 2007 || Kitt Peak || Spacewatch || EOS || align=right | 3.2 km || 
|-id=307 bgcolor=#E9E9E9
| 500307 ||  || — || October 25, 2003 || Kitt Peak || Spacewatch || MRX || align=right | 2.2 km || 
|-id=308 bgcolor=#E9E9E9
| 500308 ||  || — || August 26, 2012 || Haleakala || Pan-STARRS || GEF || align=right | 2.1 km || 
|-id=309 bgcolor=#d6d6d6
| 500309 ||  || — || August 13, 2012 || Haleakala || Pan-STARRS ||  || align=right | 3.0 km || 
|-id=310 bgcolor=#d6d6d6
| 500310 ||  || — || August 26, 2012 || Haleakala || Pan-STARRS ||  || align=right | 2.8 km || 
|-id=311 bgcolor=#d6d6d6
| 500311 ||  || — || August 12, 2012 || Kitt Peak || Spacewatch || INA || align=right | 2.9 km || 
|-id=312 bgcolor=#d6d6d6
| 500312 ||  || — || November 3, 2007 || Mount Lemmon || Mount Lemmon Survey ||  || align=right | 3.1 km || 
|-id=313 bgcolor=#E9E9E9
| 500313 ||  || — || September 15, 2012 || La Sagra || OAM Obs. || TIN || align=right | 1.1 km || 
|-id=314 bgcolor=#d6d6d6
| 500314 ||  || — || October 17, 2007 || Mount Lemmon || Mount Lemmon Survey ||  || align=right | 2.4 km || 
|-id=315 bgcolor=#d6d6d6
| 500315 ||  || — || January 20, 2009 || Catalina || CSS ||  || align=right | 3.6 km || 
|-id=316 bgcolor=#d6d6d6
| 500316 ||  || — || August 18, 2006 || Kitt Peak || Spacewatch || HYG || align=right | 2.3 km || 
|-id=317 bgcolor=#d6d6d6
| 500317 ||  || — || September 19, 2001 || Socorro || LINEAR ||  || align=right | 3.6 km || 
|-id=318 bgcolor=#d6d6d6
| 500318 ||  || — || October 7, 2007 || Catalina || CSS ||  || align=right | 2.4 km || 
|-id=319 bgcolor=#d6d6d6
| 500319 ||  || — || August 25, 2012 || Haleakala || Pan-STARRS ||  || align=right | 3.2 km || 
|-id=320 bgcolor=#d6d6d6
| 500320 ||  || — || September 15, 2012 || Kitt Peak || Spacewatch ||  || align=right | 3.1 km || 
|-id=321 bgcolor=#d6d6d6
| 500321 ||  || — || September 15, 2012 || Kitt Peak || Spacewatch ||  || align=right | 2.9 km || 
|-id=322 bgcolor=#E9E9E9
| 500322 ||  || — || May 7, 2006 || Mount Lemmon || Mount Lemmon Survey || AGN || align=right | 1.4 km || 
|-id=323 bgcolor=#d6d6d6
| 500323 ||  || — || August 13, 2012 || Haleakala || Pan-STARRS ||  || align=right | 2.5 km || 
|-id=324 bgcolor=#d6d6d6
| 500324 ||  || — || April 30, 2011 || Haleakala || Pan-STARRS ||  || align=right | 2.4 km || 
|-id=325 bgcolor=#FA8072
| 500325 ||  || — || September 13, 2007 || Catalina || CSS || H || align=right data-sort-value="0.55" | 550 m || 
|-id=326 bgcolor=#d6d6d6
| 500326 ||  || — || August 26, 2012 || Haleakala || Pan-STARRS ||  || align=right | 2.4 km || 
|-id=327 bgcolor=#d6d6d6
| 500327 ||  || — || September 17, 2012 || Kitt Peak || Spacewatch ||  || align=right | 2.5 km || 
|-id=328 bgcolor=#fefefe
| 500328 ||  || — || October 10, 2007 || Kitt Peak || Spacewatch || H || align=right data-sort-value="0.65" | 650 m || 
|-id=329 bgcolor=#d6d6d6
| 500329 ||  || — || September 17, 2012 || Kitt Peak || Spacewatch ||  || align=right | 1.9 km || 
|-id=330 bgcolor=#d6d6d6
| 500330 ||  || — || August 26, 2012 || Haleakala || Pan-STARRS ||  || align=right | 2.3 km || 
|-id=331 bgcolor=#d6d6d6
| 500331 ||  || — || September 17, 2012 || Mount Lemmon || Mount Lemmon Survey ||  || align=right | 2.4 km || 
|-id=332 bgcolor=#d6d6d6
| 500332 ||  || — || January 31, 2009 || Mount Lemmon || Mount Lemmon Survey ||  || align=right | 2.4 km || 
|-id=333 bgcolor=#d6d6d6
| 500333 ||  || — || September 18, 2012 || Kitt Peak || Spacewatch ||  || align=right | 2.5 km || 
|-id=334 bgcolor=#d6d6d6
| 500334 ||  || — || August 26, 2012 || Haleakala || Pan-STARRS ||  || align=right | 2.7 km || 
|-id=335 bgcolor=#d6d6d6
| 500335 ||  || — || August 26, 2012 || Haleakala || Pan-STARRS ||  || align=right | 2.5 km || 
|-id=336 bgcolor=#d6d6d6
| 500336 ||  || — || August 26, 2012 || Haleakala || Pan-STARRS ||  || align=right | 2.5 km || 
|-id=337 bgcolor=#d6d6d6
| 500337 ||  || — || March 13, 2010 || Mount Lemmon || Mount Lemmon Survey || TRE || align=right | 2.1 km || 
|-id=338 bgcolor=#d6d6d6
| 500338 ||  || — || October 10, 2007 || Mount Lemmon || Mount Lemmon Survey || EOS || align=right | 1.5 km || 
|-id=339 bgcolor=#d6d6d6
| 500339 ||  || — || November 13, 2007 || Mount Lemmon || Mount Lemmon Survey ||  || align=right | 3.1 km || 
|-id=340 bgcolor=#d6d6d6
| 500340 ||  || — || February 17, 2010 || Kitt Peak || Spacewatch ||  || align=right | 3.0 km || 
|-id=341 bgcolor=#d6d6d6
| 500341 ||  || — || November 9, 2007 || Catalina || CSS ||  || align=right | 2.7 km || 
|-id=342 bgcolor=#fefefe
| 500342 ||  || — || April 21, 2011 || Haleakala || Pan-STARRS || H || align=right data-sort-value="0.65" | 650 m || 
|-id=343 bgcolor=#FA8072
| 500343 ||  || — || September 27, 2012 || Catalina || CSS || H || align=right data-sort-value="0.75" | 750 m || 
|-id=344 bgcolor=#d6d6d6
| 500344 ||  || — || November 5, 2007 || Kitt Peak || Spacewatch || HYG || align=right | 2.5 km || 
|-id=345 bgcolor=#d6d6d6
| 500345 ||  || — || August 10, 2007 || Kitt Peak || Spacewatch || KOR || align=right | 1.1 km || 
|-id=346 bgcolor=#d6d6d6
| 500346 ||  || — || October 11, 2007 || Kitt Peak || Spacewatch ||  || align=right | 2.8 km || 
|-id=347 bgcolor=#d6d6d6
| 500347 ||  || — || October 20, 2007 || Kitt Peak || Spacewatch ||  || align=right | 1.8 km || 
|-id=348 bgcolor=#d6d6d6
| 500348 ||  || — || October 5, 2012 || Haleakala || Pan-STARRS || EUP || align=right | 4.5 km || 
|-id=349 bgcolor=#d6d6d6
| 500349 ||  || — || October 5, 2012 || Mount Lemmon || Mount Lemmon Survey ||  || align=right | 2.4 km || 
|-id=350 bgcolor=#d6d6d6
| 500350 ||  || — || October 14, 2001 || Socorro || LINEAR ||  || align=right | 2.2 km || 
|-id=351 bgcolor=#d6d6d6
| 500351 ||  || — || September 19, 2012 || Mount Lemmon || Mount Lemmon Survey ||  || align=right | 2.7 km || 
|-id=352 bgcolor=#d6d6d6
| 500352 ||  || — || August 28, 2012 || Mount Lemmon || Mount Lemmon Survey || URS || align=right | 2.7 km || 
|-id=353 bgcolor=#d6d6d6
| 500353 ||  || — || September 23, 2012 || Mount Lemmon || Mount Lemmon Survey || EUP || align=right | 3.4 km || 
|-id=354 bgcolor=#d6d6d6
| 500354 ||  || — || October 15, 2007 || Mount Lemmon || Mount Lemmon Survey ||  || align=right | 2.7 km || 
|-id=355 bgcolor=#fefefe
| 500355 ||  || — || March 6, 2011 || Catalina || CSS || H || align=right data-sort-value="0.59" | 590 m || 
|-id=356 bgcolor=#d6d6d6
| 500356 ||  || — || November 5, 2007 || Mount Lemmon || Mount Lemmon Survey || THM || align=right | 1.8 km || 
|-id=357 bgcolor=#d6d6d6
| 500357 ||  || — || November 19, 2007 || Kitt Peak || Spacewatch || THM || align=right | 1.7 km || 
|-id=358 bgcolor=#d6d6d6
| 500358 ||  || — || April 9, 2010 || Mount Lemmon || Mount Lemmon Survey ||  || align=right | 2.6 km || 
|-id=359 bgcolor=#d6d6d6
| 500359 ||  || — || September 22, 2012 || Kitt Peak || Spacewatch ||  || align=right | 2.8 km || 
|-id=360 bgcolor=#d6d6d6
| 500360 ||  || — || August 25, 2001 || Socorro || LINEAR ||  || align=right | 2.5 km || 
|-id=361 bgcolor=#d6d6d6
| 500361 ||  || — || September 16, 2012 || Kitt Peak || Spacewatch || EOS || align=right | 2.8 km || 
|-id=362 bgcolor=#d6d6d6
| 500362 ||  || — || September 19, 2001 || Socorro || LINEAR ||  || align=right | 2.1 km || 
|-id=363 bgcolor=#E9E9E9
| 500363 ||  || — || January 30, 2011 || Haleakala || Pan-STARRS || GEF || align=right | 1.7 km || 
|-id=364 bgcolor=#d6d6d6
| 500364 ||  || — || August 13, 2012 || Kitt Peak || Spacewatch ||  || align=right | 2.7 km || 
|-id=365 bgcolor=#d6d6d6
| 500365 ||  || — || September 13, 2007 || Kitt Peak || Spacewatch ||  || align=right | 1.9 km || 
|-id=366 bgcolor=#d6d6d6
| 500366 ||  || — || September 21, 2012 || Catalina || CSS ||  || align=right | 2.9 km || 
|-id=367 bgcolor=#d6d6d6
| 500367 ||  || — || October 6, 2012 || Haleakala || Pan-STARRS ||  || align=right | 3.4 km || 
|-id=368 bgcolor=#d6d6d6
| 500368 ||  || — || October 8, 2012 || Mount Lemmon || Mount Lemmon Survey ||  || align=right | 3.2 km || 
|-id=369 bgcolor=#d6d6d6
| 500369 ||  || — || July 12, 2010 || WISE || WISE ||  || align=right | 2.9 km || 
|-id=370 bgcolor=#d6d6d6
| 500370 ||  || — || February 16, 2009 || La Sagra || OAM Obs. || EOS || align=right | 3.1 km || 
|-id=371 bgcolor=#d6d6d6
| 500371 ||  || — || August 27, 2006 || Kitt Peak || Spacewatch || VER  EOS || align=right | 2.2 km || 
|-id=372 bgcolor=#d6d6d6
| 500372 ||  || — || October 16, 2007 || Mount Lemmon || Mount Lemmon Survey ||  || align=right | 2.2 km || 
|-id=373 bgcolor=#d6d6d6
| 500373 ||  || — || October 6, 2012 || Kitt Peak || Spacewatch ||  || align=right | 3.2 km || 
|-id=374 bgcolor=#d6d6d6
| 500374 ||  || — || October 6, 2012 || Kitt Peak || Spacewatch ||  || align=right | 3.8 km || 
|-id=375 bgcolor=#d6d6d6
| 500375 ||  || — || February 8, 2010 || WISE || WISE ||  || align=right | 3.9 km || 
|-id=376 bgcolor=#d6d6d6
| 500376 ||  || — || September 19, 2012 || Mount Lemmon || Mount Lemmon Survey ||  || align=right | 2.3 km || 
|-id=377 bgcolor=#d6d6d6
| 500377 ||  || — || October 8, 2012 || Mount Lemmon || Mount Lemmon Survey ||  || align=right | 2.5 km || 
|-id=378 bgcolor=#d6d6d6
| 500378 ||  || — || March 13, 2010 || Kitt Peak || Spacewatch ||  || align=right | 2.9 km || 
|-id=379 bgcolor=#d6d6d6
| 500379 ||  || — || September 18, 1995 || Kitt Peak || Spacewatch ||  || align=right | 2.3 km || 
|-id=380 bgcolor=#d6d6d6
| 500380 ||  || — || January 20, 2009 || Kitt Peak || Spacewatch || VER || align=right | 2.5 km || 
|-id=381 bgcolor=#d6d6d6
| 500381 ||  || — || October 8, 2012 || Mount Lemmon || Mount Lemmon Survey ||  || align=right | 2.6 km || 
|-id=382 bgcolor=#d6d6d6
| 500382 ||  || — || August 28, 2006 || Kitt Peak || Spacewatch || THM || align=right | 1.8 km || 
|-id=383 bgcolor=#d6d6d6
| 500383 ||  || — || October 20, 1995 || Kitt Peak || Spacewatch || LIX || align=right | 3.3 km || 
|-id=384 bgcolor=#d6d6d6
| 500384 ||  || — || October 8, 2012 || Haleakala || Pan-STARRS || THM || align=right | 2.5 km || 
|-id=385 bgcolor=#d6d6d6
| 500385 ||  || — || October 14, 2001 || Kitt Peak || Spacewatch ||  || align=right | 2.3 km || 
|-id=386 bgcolor=#d6d6d6
| 500386 ||  || — || November 1, 2007 || Kitt Peak || Spacewatch ||  || align=right | 2.5 km || 
|-id=387 bgcolor=#d6d6d6
| 500387 ||  || — || October 6, 2012 || Mount Lemmon || Mount Lemmon Survey ||  || align=right | 2.1 km || 
|-id=388 bgcolor=#d6d6d6
| 500388 ||  || — || March 17, 2004 || Kitt Peak || Spacewatch ||  || align=right | 2.8 km || 
|-id=389 bgcolor=#d6d6d6
| 500389 ||  || — || October 6, 2012 || Mount Lemmon || Mount Lemmon Survey ||  || align=right | 2.4 km || 
|-id=390 bgcolor=#d6d6d6
| 500390 ||  || — || September 16, 2012 || Kitt Peak || Spacewatch ||  || align=right | 2.4 km || 
|-id=391 bgcolor=#d6d6d6
| 500391 ||  || — || November 18, 2007 || Mount Lemmon || Mount Lemmon Survey || HYG || align=right | 2.5 km || 
|-id=392 bgcolor=#d6d6d6
| 500392 ||  || — || September 22, 1995 || Kitt Peak || Spacewatch || THM || align=right | 2.1 km || 
|-id=393 bgcolor=#d6d6d6
| 500393 ||  || — || October 6, 2012 || Haleakala || Pan-STARRS ||  || align=right | 3.0 km || 
|-id=394 bgcolor=#d6d6d6
| 500394 ||  || — || October 7, 2012 || Haleakala || Pan-STARRS || THM || align=right | 2.0 km || 
|-id=395 bgcolor=#d6d6d6
| 500395 ||  || — || October 15, 2007 || Mount Lemmon || Mount Lemmon Survey ||  || align=right | 2.0 km || 
|-id=396 bgcolor=#d6d6d6
| 500396 ||  || — || October 7, 2012 || Haleakala || Pan-STARRS || EOS || align=right | 2.0 km || 
|-id=397 bgcolor=#E9E9E9
| 500397 ||  || — || October 7, 2012 || Haleakala || Pan-STARRS || HOF || align=right | 1.8 km || 
|-id=398 bgcolor=#d6d6d6
| 500398 ||  || — || November 19, 2007 || Kitt Peak || Spacewatch || VER || align=right | 2.8 km || 
|-id=399 bgcolor=#d6d6d6
| 500399 ||  || — || November 4, 2007 || Kitt Peak || Spacewatch ||  || align=right | 2.1 km || 
|-id=400 bgcolor=#d6d6d6
| 500400 ||  || — || October 8, 2012 || Kitt Peak || Spacewatch ||  || align=right | 2.6 km || 
|}

500401–500500 

|-bgcolor=#d6d6d6
| 500401 ||  || — || September 16, 2012 || Kitt Peak || Spacewatch ||  || align=right | 2.5 km || 
|-id=402 bgcolor=#d6d6d6
| 500402 ||  || — || September 23, 2001 || Kitt Peak || Spacewatch ||  || align=right | 2.1 km || 
|-id=403 bgcolor=#d6d6d6
| 500403 ||  || — || November 7, 2007 || Kitt Peak || Spacewatch ||  || align=right | 2.0 km || 
|-id=404 bgcolor=#d6d6d6
| 500404 ||  || — || November 8, 2007 || Kitt Peak || Spacewatch ||  || align=right | 3.3 km || 
|-id=405 bgcolor=#d6d6d6
| 500405 ||  || — || February 18, 2010 || Mount Lemmon || Mount Lemmon Survey ||  || align=right | 3.1 km || 
|-id=406 bgcolor=#d6d6d6
| 500406 ||  || — || October 10, 2012 || Mount Lemmon || Mount Lemmon Survey || EOS || align=right | 1.7 km || 
|-id=407 bgcolor=#d6d6d6
| 500407 ||  || — || September 25, 2007 || Mount Lemmon || Mount Lemmon Survey ||  || align=right | 2.9 km || 
|-id=408 bgcolor=#d6d6d6
| 500408 ||  || — || August 27, 2006 || Kitt Peak || Spacewatch || EOS || align=right | 2.4 km || 
|-id=409 bgcolor=#d6d6d6
| 500409 ||  || — || August 28, 2006 || Kitt Peak || Spacewatch || VER || align=right | 2.0 km || 
|-id=410 bgcolor=#d6d6d6
| 500410 ||  || — || October 17, 2007 || Mount Lemmon || Mount Lemmon Survey || EOS || align=right | 1.3 km || 
|-id=411 bgcolor=#d6d6d6
| 500411 ||  || — || August 18, 2006 || Kitt Peak || Spacewatch || VER || align=right | 2.3 km || 
|-id=412 bgcolor=#d6d6d6
| 500412 ||  || — || November 4, 2007 || Mount Lemmon || Mount Lemmon Survey ||  || align=right | 2.0 km || 
|-id=413 bgcolor=#d6d6d6
| 500413 ||  || — || November 11, 2007 || Mount Lemmon || Mount Lemmon Survey ||  || align=right | 2.5 km || 
|-id=414 bgcolor=#d6d6d6
| 500414 ||  || — || October 10, 2012 || Mount Lemmon || Mount Lemmon Survey ||  || align=right | 3.2 km || 
|-id=415 bgcolor=#d6d6d6
| 500415 ||  || — || November 5, 2007 || Kitt Peak || Spacewatch ||  || align=right | 2.3 km || 
|-id=416 bgcolor=#d6d6d6
| 500416 ||  || — || December 22, 2008 || Kitt Peak || Spacewatch ||  || align=right | 2.3 km || 
|-id=417 bgcolor=#d6d6d6
| 500417 ||  || — || October 11, 2007 || Kitt Peak || Spacewatch ||  || align=right | 2.5 km || 
|-id=418 bgcolor=#d6d6d6
| 500418 ||  || — || November 4, 2007 || Kitt Peak || Spacewatch || EOS || align=right | 1.5 km || 
|-id=419 bgcolor=#d6d6d6
| 500419 ||  || — || October 12, 1996 || Kitt Peak || Spacewatch ||  || align=right | 2.7 km || 
|-id=420 bgcolor=#d6d6d6
| 500420 ||  || — || November 8, 2007 || Kitt Peak || Spacewatch || THM || align=right | 1.7 km || 
|-id=421 bgcolor=#d6d6d6
| 500421 ||  || — || September 17, 2012 || Kitt Peak || Spacewatch ||  || align=right | 2.2 km || 
|-id=422 bgcolor=#fefefe
| 500422 ||  || — || September 10, 2007 || Mount Lemmon || Mount Lemmon Survey || H || align=right data-sort-value="0.58" | 580 m || 
|-id=423 bgcolor=#d6d6d6
| 500423 ||  || — || October 8, 2012 || Mount Lemmon || Mount Lemmon Survey ||  || align=right | 2.7 km || 
|-id=424 bgcolor=#d6d6d6
| 500424 ||  || — || November 18, 2007 || Mount Lemmon || Mount Lemmon Survey ||  || align=right | 2.0 km || 
|-id=425 bgcolor=#d6d6d6
| 500425 ||  || — || February 19, 2010 || Mount Lemmon || Mount Lemmon Survey ||  || align=right | 3.0 km || 
|-id=426 bgcolor=#d6d6d6
| 500426 ||  || — || October 6, 2012 || Haleakala || Pan-STARRS ||  || align=right | 2.5 km || 
|-id=427 bgcolor=#d6d6d6
| 500427 ||  || — || December 29, 2008 || Kitt Peak || Spacewatch || KOR || align=right | 1.9 km || 
|-id=428 bgcolor=#d6d6d6
| 500428 ||  || — || September 16, 2012 || Kitt Peak || Spacewatch || HYG || align=right | 2.0 km || 
|-id=429 bgcolor=#fefefe
| 500429 ||  || — || April 11, 2011 || Haleakala || Pan-STARRS || H || align=right data-sort-value="0.57" | 570 m || 
|-id=430 bgcolor=#fefefe
| 500430 ||  || — || April 9, 2006 || Mount Lemmon || Mount Lemmon Survey || H || align=right data-sort-value="0.63" | 630 m || 
|-id=431 bgcolor=#d6d6d6
| 500431 ||  || — || November 16, 1995 || Kitt Peak || Spacewatch || THB || align=right | 2.4 km || 
|-id=432 bgcolor=#d6d6d6
| 500432 ||  || — || October 13, 2001 || Kitt Peak || Spacewatch || 637 || align=right | 2.3 km || 
|-id=433 bgcolor=#d6d6d6
| 500433 ||  || — || September 20, 2001 || Kitt Peak || Spacewatch || HYG || align=right | 1.8 km || 
|-id=434 bgcolor=#d6d6d6
| 500434 ||  || — || October 16, 2007 || Mount Lemmon || Mount Lemmon Survey || HYG || align=right | 2.0 km || 
|-id=435 bgcolor=#d6d6d6
| 500435 ||  || — || October 16, 2007 || Mount Lemmon || Mount Lemmon Survey || EOS || align=right | 1.6 km || 
|-id=436 bgcolor=#d6d6d6
| 500436 ||  || — || May 16, 2005 || Mount Lemmon || Mount Lemmon Survey ||  || align=right | 2.5 km || 
|-id=437 bgcolor=#d6d6d6
| 500437 ||  || — || November 15, 2007 || Mount Lemmon || Mount Lemmon Survey || HYG || align=right | 2.1 km || 
|-id=438 bgcolor=#d6d6d6
| 500438 ||  || — || October 8, 2012 || Haleakala || Pan-STARRS ||  || align=right | 2.2 km || 
|-id=439 bgcolor=#d6d6d6
| 500439 ||  || — || September 23, 2012 || Kitt Peak || Spacewatch ||  || align=right | 2.1 km || 
|-id=440 bgcolor=#d6d6d6
| 500440 ||  || — || October 8, 2012 || Haleakala || Pan-STARRS ||  || align=right | 2.8 km || 
|-id=441 bgcolor=#d6d6d6
| 500441 ||  || — || August 21, 2006 || Kitt Peak || Spacewatch || THM || align=right | 2.3 km || 
|-id=442 bgcolor=#d6d6d6
| 500442 ||  || — || November 7, 2007 || Kitt Peak || Spacewatch || HYG || align=right | 2.5 km || 
|-id=443 bgcolor=#d6d6d6
| 500443 ||  || — || January 13, 2010 || WISE || WISE ||  || align=right | 2.3 km || 
|-id=444 bgcolor=#d6d6d6
| 500444 ||  || — || October 19, 2007 || Kitt Peak || Spacewatch || HYG || align=right | 2.5 km || 
|-id=445 bgcolor=#d6d6d6
| 500445 ||  || — || September 21, 2012 || Kitt Peak || Spacewatch || EOS || align=right | 1.5 km || 
|-id=446 bgcolor=#d6d6d6
| 500446 ||  || — || October 8, 2012 || Mount Lemmon || Mount Lemmon Survey || EOS || align=right | 1.5 km || 
|-id=447 bgcolor=#d6d6d6
| 500447 ||  || — || October 9, 2012 || Mount Lemmon || Mount Lemmon Survey || URS || align=right | 3.6 km || 
|-id=448 bgcolor=#d6d6d6
| 500448 ||  || — || October 11, 2007 || Kitt Peak || Spacewatch || EOS || align=right | 1.7 km || 
|-id=449 bgcolor=#d6d6d6
| 500449 ||  || — || November 2, 2007 || Kitt Peak || Spacewatch ||  || align=right | 1.8 km || 
|-id=450 bgcolor=#d6d6d6
| 500450 ||  || — || September 16, 2012 || Kitt Peak || Spacewatch ||  || align=right | 2.4 km || 
|-id=451 bgcolor=#d6d6d6
| 500451 ||  || — || November 5, 2007 || Mount Lemmon || Mount Lemmon Survey || HYG || align=right | 2.0 km || 
|-id=452 bgcolor=#d6d6d6
| 500452 ||  || — || October 9, 2007 || Mount Lemmon || Mount Lemmon Survey ||  || align=right | 1.7 km || 
|-id=453 bgcolor=#d6d6d6
| 500453 ||  || — || October 11, 2012 || Mount Lemmon || Mount Lemmon Survey ||  || align=right | 2.3 km || 
|-id=454 bgcolor=#d6d6d6
| 500454 ||  || — || September 18, 2012 || Kitt Peak || Spacewatch || THM || align=right | 2.0 km || 
|-id=455 bgcolor=#fefefe
| 500455 ||  || — || September 21, 2012 || Mount Lemmon || Mount Lemmon Survey || critical || align=right data-sort-value="0.71" | 710 m || 
|-id=456 bgcolor=#d6d6d6
| 500456 ||  || — || November 20, 2007 || Mount Lemmon || Mount Lemmon Survey || EOS || align=right | 1.7 km || 
|-id=457 bgcolor=#d6d6d6
| 500457 ||  || — || September 14, 2007 || Mount Lemmon || Mount Lemmon Survey ||  || align=right | 2.2 km || 
|-id=458 bgcolor=#d6d6d6
| 500458 ||  || — || January 29, 2009 || Kitt Peak || Spacewatch ||  || align=right | 2.1 km || 
|-id=459 bgcolor=#d6d6d6
| 500459 ||  || — || March 20, 2010 || Mount Lemmon || Mount Lemmon Survey ||  || align=right | 3.8 km || 
|-id=460 bgcolor=#d6d6d6
| 500460 ||  || — || February 22, 2009 || Kitt Peak || Spacewatch ||  || align=right | 2.7 km || 
|-id=461 bgcolor=#d6d6d6
| 500461 ||  || — || August 21, 2006 || Kitt Peak || Spacewatch || THM  BGL || align=right | 2.1 km || 
|-id=462 bgcolor=#d6d6d6
| 500462 ||  || — || October 20, 2007 || Mount Lemmon || Mount Lemmon Survey || THM || align=right | 2.2 km || 
|-id=463 bgcolor=#d6d6d6
| 500463 ||  || — || May 11, 2010 || Kitt Peak || Spacewatch ||  || align=right | 2.9 km || 
|-id=464 bgcolor=#d6d6d6
| 500464 ||  || — || December 20, 2007 || Kitt Peak || Spacewatch ||  || align=right | 2.5 km || 
|-id=465 bgcolor=#d6d6d6
| 500465 ||  || — || October 7, 2007 || Mount Lemmon || Mount Lemmon Survey ||  || align=right | 1.9 km || 
|-id=466 bgcolor=#d6d6d6
| 500466 ||  || — || October 10, 2007 || Mount Lemmon || Mount Lemmon Survey ||  || align=right | 2.8 km || 
|-id=467 bgcolor=#d6d6d6
| 500467 ||  || — || December 20, 2007 || Mount Lemmon || Mount Lemmon Survey ||  || align=right | 3.1 km || 
|-id=468 bgcolor=#d6d6d6
| 500468 ||  || — || October 9, 2007 || Mount Lemmon || Mount Lemmon Survey ||  || align=right | 2.1 km || 
|-id=469 bgcolor=#d6d6d6
| 500469 ||  || — || January 25, 2009 || Kitt Peak || Spacewatch ||  || align=right | 1.9 km || 
|-id=470 bgcolor=#d6d6d6
| 500470 ||  || — || November 12, 2007 || Mount Lemmon || Mount Lemmon Survey ||  || align=right | 2.0 km || 
|-id=471 bgcolor=#d6d6d6
| 500471 ||  || — || July 22, 1995 || Kitt Peak || Spacewatch ||  || align=right | 2.3 km || 
|-id=472 bgcolor=#fefefe
| 500472 ||  || — || October 6, 2012 || Haleakala || Pan-STARRS || H || align=right data-sort-value="0.57" | 570 m || 
|-id=473 bgcolor=#d6d6d6
| 500473 ||  || — || October 20, 2007 || Mount Lemmon || Mount Lemmon Survey || HYG || align=right | 2.5 km || 
|-id=474 bgcolor=#d6d6d6
| 500474 ||  || — || October 7, 2012 || Haleakala || Pan-STARRS ||  || align=right | 2.3 km || 
|-id=475 bgcolor=#d6d6d6
| 500475 ||  || — || October 7, 2012 || Haleakala || Pan-STARRS || HYG || align=right | 2.7 km || 
|-id=476 bgcolor=#d6d6d6
| 500476 ||  || — || October 7, 2012 || Haleakala || Pan-STARRS || HYG || align=right | 2.3 km || 
|-id=477 bgcolor=#d6d6d6
| 500477 ||  || — || September 14, 2012 || Kitt Peak || Spacewatch ||  || align=right | 2.3 km || 
|-id=478 bgcolor=#d6d6d6
| 500478 ||  || — || September 18, 2012 || Kitt Peak || Spacewatch || EOS || align=right | 1.6 km || 
|-id=479 bgcolor=#d6d6d6
| 500479 ||  || — || May 21, 2011 || Mount Lemmon || Mount Lemmon Survey ||  || align=right | 2.1 km || 
|-id=480 bgcolor=#d6d6d6
| 500480 ||  || — || October 8, 2012 || Haleakala || Pan-STARRS ||  || align=right | 3.1 km || 
|-id=481 bgcolor=#fefefe
| 500481 ||  || — || March 24, 2006 || Mount Lemmon || Mount Lemmon Survey || H || align=right data-sort-value="0.60" | 600 m || 
|-id=482 bgcolor=#d6d6d6
| 500482 ||  || — || September 15, 2006 || Kitt Peak || Spacewatch || VER || align=right | 2.4 km || 
|-id=483 bgcolor=#d6d6d6
| 500483 ||  || — || April 1, 2010 || La Sagra || OAM Obs. || TIR || align=right | 3.1 km || 
|-id=484 bgcolor=#d6d6d6
| 500484 ||  || — || July 28, 2011 || Siding Spring || SSS ||  || align=right | 3.2 km || 
|-id=485 bgcolor=#d6d6d6
| 500485 ||  || — || January 18, 2009 || Kitt Peak || Spacewatch ||  || align=right | 3.5 km || 
|-id=486 bgcolor=#d6d6d6
| 500486 ||  || — || October 10, 2007 || Catalina || CSS ||  || align=right | 1.9 km || 
|-id=487 bgcolor=#d6d6d6
| 500487 ||  || — || March 26, 1995 || Kitt Peak || Spacewatch ||  || align=right | 2.5 km || 
|-id=488 bgcolor=#d6d6d6
| 500488 ||  || — || August 19, 2006 || Kitt Peak || Spacewatch ||  || align=right | 2.5 km || 
|-id=489 bgcolor=#d6d6d6
| 500489 ||  || — || September 16, 2012 || Kitt Peak || Spacewatch || EOS || align=right | 2.5 km || 
|-id=490 bgcolor=#d6d6d6
| 500490 ||  || — || February 14, 2010 || WISE || WISE ||  || align=right | 2.3 km || 
|-id=491 bgcolor=#d6d6d6
| 500491 ||  || — || October 10, 2007 || Kitt Peak || Spacewatch ||  || align=right | 2.1 km || 
|-id=492 bgcolor=#d6d6d6
| 500492 ||  || — || November 2, 2007 || Mount Lemmon || Mount Lemmon Survey ||  || align=right | 2.2 km || 
|-id=493 bgcolor=#d6d6d6
| 500493 ||  || — || September 9, 2007 || Mount Lemmon || Mount Lemmon Survey ||  || align=right | 1.9 km || 
|-id=494 bgcolor=#d6d6d6
| 500494 ||  || — || September 23, 2012 || Kitt Peak || Spacewatch || HYG || align=right | 2.7 km || 
|-id=495 bgcolor=#d6d6d6
| 500495 ||  || — || October 8, 2012 || Haleakala || Pan-STARRS ||  || align=right | 2.5 km || 
|-id=496 bgcolor=#d6d6d6
| 500496 ||  || — || November 7, 2007 || Kitt Peak || Spacewatch || EOS || align=right | 1.7 km || 
|-id=497 bgcolor=#d6d6d6
| 500497 ||  || — || August 10, 2007 || Kitt Peak || Spacewatch ||  || align=right | 1.5 km || 
|-id=498 bgcolor=#d6d6d6
| 500498 ||  || — || October 11, 2012 || Haleakala || Pan-STARRS ||  || align=right | 2.0 km || 
|-id=499 bgcolor=#d6d6d6
| 500499 ||  || — || October 15, 2012 || Mount Lemmon || Mount Lemmon Survey ||  || align=right | 1.8 km || 
|-id=500 bgcolor=#d6d6d6
| 500500 ||  || — || October 18, 2007 || Kitt Peak || Spacewatch ||  || align=right | 2.6 km || 
|}

500501–500600 

|-bgcolor=#d6d6d6
| 500501 ||  || — || September 18, 2012 || Mount Lemmon || Mount Lemmon Survey || TIR || align=right | 3.0 km || 
|-id=502 bgcolor=#d6d6d6
| 500502 ||  || — || October 5, 2012 || Kitt Peak || Spacewatch ||  || align=right | 2.7 km || 
|-id=503 bgcolor=#d6d6d6
| 500503 ||  || — || August 21, 2006 || Kitt Peak || Spacewatch || HYG || align=right | 2.5 km || 
|-id=504 bgcolor=#d6d6d6
| 500504 ||  || — || October 6, 2012 || Mount Lemmon || Mount Lemmon Survey ||  || align=right | 2.6 km || 
|-id=505 bgcolor=#d6d6d6
| 500505 ||  || — || October 8, 2012 || Haleakala || Pan-STARRS || HYG || align=right | 2.5 km || 
|-id=506 bgcolor=#d6d6d6
| 500506 ||  || — || October 9, 2012 || Kitt Peak || Spacewatch ||  || align=right | 2.5 km || 
|-id=507 bgcolor=#d6d6d6
| 500507 ||  || — || October 9, 2007 || Kitt Peak || Spacewatch ||  || align=right | 2.4 km || 
|-id=508 bgcolor=#d6d6d6
| 500508 ||  || — || December 16, 2007 || Kitt Peak || Spacewatch ||  || align=right | 2.9 km || 
|-id=509 bgcolor=#d6d6d6
| 500509 ||  || — || October 10, 2012 || Mount Lemmon || Mount Lemmon Survey ||  || align=right | 2.8 km || 
|-id=510 bgcolor=#d6d6d6
| 500510 ||  || — || May 25, 2006 || Mount Lemmon || Mount Lemmon Survey ||  || align=right | 2.8 km || 
|-id=511 bgcolor=#d6d6d6
| 500511 ||  || — || October 10, 2012 || Mount Lemmon || Mount Lemmon Survey || EOS || align=right | 2.4 km || 
|-id=512 bgcolor=#d6d6d6
| 500512 ||  || — || November 17, 2007 || Mount Lemmon || Mount Lemmon Survey ||  || align=right | 2.4 km || 
|-id=513 bgcolor=#d6d6d6
| 500513 ||  || — || January 25, 2009 || Kitt Peak || Spacewatch || EOS || align=right | 1.6 km || 
|-id=514 bgcolor=#d6d6d6
| 500514 ||  || — || September 19, 2001 || Socorro || LINEAR ||  || align=right | 2.4 km || 
|-id=515 bgcolor=#d6d6d6
| 500515 ||  || — || October 14, 2012 || Kitt Peak || Spacewatch ||  || align=right | 3.2 km || 
|-id=516 bgcolor=#d6d6d6
| 500516 ||  || — || February 28, 2009 || Kitt Peak || Spacewatch ||  || align=right | 2.9 km || 
|-id=517 bgcolor=#d6d6d6
| 500517 ||  || — || October 22, 2006 || Mount Lemmon || Mount Lemmon Survey ||  || align=right | 2.5 km || 
|-id=518 bgcolor=#E9E9E9
| 500518 ||  || — || August 14, 2012 || Haleakala || Pan-STARRS || DOR || align=right | 2.3 km || 
|-id=519 bgcolor=#d6d6d6
| 500519 ||  || — || August 28, 2012 || Mount Lemmon || Mount Lemmon Survey ||  || align=right | 3.5 km || 
|-id=520 bgcolor=#d6d6d6
| 500520 ||  || — || November 4, 2007 || Kitt Peak || Spacewatch ||  || align=right | 2.5 km || 
|-id=521 bgcolor=#d6d6d6
| 500521 ||  || — || October 5, 2007 || Kitt Peak || Spacewatch ||  || align=right | 1.9 km || 
|-id=522 bgcolor=#d6d6d6
| 500522 ||  || — || October 9, 2007 || Catalina || CSS ||  || align=right | 2.9 km || 
|-id=523 bgcolor=#d6d6d6
| 500523 ||  || — || September 16, 2006 || Catalina || CSS ||  || align=right | 3.2 km || 
|-id=524 bgcolor=#d6d6d6
| 500524 ||  || — || September 14, 2006 || Catalina || CSS || TIR || align=right | 2.9 km || 
|-id=525 bgcolor=#FA8072
| 500525 ||  || — || September 24, 2012 || Mount Lemmon || Mount Lemmon Survey || H || align=right data-sort-value="0.52" | 520 m || 
|-id=526 bgcolor=#d6d6d6
| 500526 ||  || — || September 20, 2001 || Socorro || LINEAR ||  || align=right | 2.8 km || 
|-id=527 bgcolor=#fefefe
| 500527 ||  || — || September 15, 2012 || Catalina || CSS ||  || align=right data-sort-value="0.94" | 940 m || 
|-id=528 bgcolor=#d6d6d6
| 500528 ||  || — || November 8, 2007 || Mount Lemmon || Mount Lemmon Survey ||  || align=right | 2.4 km || 
|-id=529 bgcolor=#d6d6d6
| 500529 ||  || — || October 6, 2012 || Haleakala || Pan-STARRS ||  || align=right | 2.8 km || 
|-id=530 bgcolor=#fefefe
| 500530 ||  || — || September 24, 2009 || Mount Lemmon || Mount Lemmon Survey || H || align=right data-sort-value="0.80" | 800 m || 
|-id=531 bgcolor=#d6d6d6
| 500531 ||  || — || October 6, 2012 || Haleakala || Pan-STARRS ||  || align=right | 3.0 km || 
|-id=532 bgcolor=#d6d6d6
| 500532 ||  || — || December 16, 2007 || Kitt Peak || Spacewatch ||  || align=right | 3.3 km || 
|-id=533 bgcolor=#d6d6d6
| 500533 ||  || — || November 3, 2007 || Kitt Peak || Spacewatch ||  || align=right | 2.3 km || 
|-id=534 bgcolor=#d6d6d6
| 500534 ||  || — || November 12, 2007 || Mount Lemmon || Mount Lemmon Survey ||  || align=right | 2.2 km || 
|-id=535 bgcolor=#d6d6d6
| 500535 ||  || — || October 16, 2012 || Mount Lemmon || Mount Lemmon Survey ||  || align=right | 2.0 km || 
|-id=536 bgcolor=#d6d6d6
| 500536 ||  || — || October 16, 2012 || Mount Lemmon || Mount Lemmon Survey || EOS || align=right | 1.7 km || 
|-id=537 bgcolor=#fefefe
| 500537 ||  || — || September 17, 2012 || Kitt Peak || Spacewatch || H || align=right data-sort-value="0.48" | 480 m || 
|-id=538 bgcolor=#d6d6d6
| 500538 ||  || — || October 11, 2007 || Kitt Peak || Spacewatch ||  || align=right | 1.9 km || 
|-id=539 bgcolor=#d6d6d6
| 500539 ||  || — || October 17, 2012 || Mount Lemmon || Mount Lemmon Survey ||  || align=right | 2.8 km || 
|-id=540 bgcolor=#d6d6d6
| 500540 ||  || — || September 21, 2001 || Socorro || LINEAR ||  || align=right | 1.9 km || 
|-id=541 bgcolor=#d6d6d6
| 500541 ||  || — || July 26, 2011 || Haleakala || Pan-STARRS ||  || align=right | 3.1 km || 
|-id=542 bgcolor=#d6d6d6
| 500542 ||  || — || November 20, 2007 || Mount Lemmon || Mount Lemmon Survey ||  || align=right | 2.9 km || 
|-id=543 bgcolor=#d6d6d6
| 500543 ||  || — || November 9, 2007 || Mount Lemmon || Mount Lemmon Survey ||  || align=right | 2.7 km || 
|-id=544 bgcolor=#d6d6d6
| 500544 ||  || — || October 17, 2012 || Haleakala || Pan-STARRS ||  || align=right | 2.2 km || 
|-id=545 bgcolor=#d6d6d6
| 500545 ||  || — || July 28, 2011 || Haleakala || Pan-STARRS || EOS || align=right | 3.3 km || 
|-id=546 bgcolor=#d6d6d6
| 500546 ||  || — || August 28, 2001 || Anderson Mesa || LONEOS || Tj (2.95) || align=right | 3.0 km || 
|-id=547 bgcolor=#d6d6d6
| 500547 ||  || — || December 19, 2007 || Kitt Peak || Spacewatch ||  || align=right | 2.6 km || 
|-id=548 bgcolor=#d6d6d6
| 500548 ||  || — || October 2, 2006 || Kitt Peak || Spacewatch || HYG || align=right | 3.2 km || 
|-id=549 bgcolor=#d6d6d6
| 500549 ||  || — || July 22, 2006 || Mount Lemmon || Mount Lemmon Survey || THM || align=right | 2.0 km || 
|-id=550 bgcolor=#d6d6d6
| 500550 ||  || — || October 20, 2006 || Kitt Peak || Spacewatch || EOS || align=right | 2.9 km || 
|-id=551 bgcolor=#d6d6d6
| 500551 ||  || — || October 5, 2012 || Kitt Peak || Spacewatch || THM || align=right | 2.2 km || 
|-id=552 bgcolor=#d6d6d6
| 500552 ||  || — || March 21, 2010 || Kitt Peak || Spacewatch || EOS || align=right | 1.8 km || 
|-id=553 bgcolor=#d6d6d6
| 500553 ||  || — || September 16, 2012 || Mount Lemmon || Mount Lemmon Survey || EOS || align=right | 2.8 km || 
|-id=554 bgcolor=#d6d6d6
| 500554 ||  || — || April 15, 2005 || Kitt Peak || Spacewatch ||  || align=right | 4.9 km || 
|-id=555 bgcolor=#d6d6d6
| 500555 ||  || — || September 19, 2001 || Socorro || LINEAR ||  || align=right | 2.3 km || 
|-id=556 bgcolor=#d6d6d6
| 500556 ||  || — || July 21, 2006 || Mount Lemmon || Mount Lemmon Survey || HYG || align=right | 2.2 km || 
|-id=557 bgcolor=#d6d6d6
| 500557 ||  || — || September 14, 2006 || Kitt Peak || Spacewatch || THM || align=right | 2.3 km || 
|-id=558 bgcolor=#d6d6d6
| 500558 ||  || — || May 9, 2010 || Mount Lemmon || Mount Lemmon Survey || EOS || align=right | 2.1 km || 
|-id=559 bgcolor=#d6d6d6
| 500559 ||  || — || September 22, 2001 || Kitt Peak || Spacewatch || THM || align=right | 1.8 km || 
|-id=560 bgcolor=#d6d6d6
| 500560 ||  || — || October 19, 2012 || Haleakala || Pan-STARRS || HYG || align=right | 2.3 km || 
|-id=561 bgcolor=#d6d6d6
| 500561 ||  || — || October 19, 2012 || Haleakala || Pan-STARRS ||  || align=right | 2.9 km || 
|-id=562 bgcolor=#d6d6d6
| 500562 ||  || — || August 24, 2007 || Kitt Peak || Spacewatch ||  || align=right | 2.3 km || 
|-id=563 bgcolor=#fefefe
| 500563 ||  || — || May 8, 2008 || Mount Lemmon || Mount Lemmon Survey ||  || align=right data-sort-value="0.56" | 560 m || 
|-id=564 bgcolor=#d6d6d6
| 500564 ||  || — || March 18, 2009 || Kitt Peak || Spacewatch ||  || align=right | 2.8 km || 
|-id=565 bgcolor=#fefefe
| 500565 ||  || — || October 5, 1999 || Socorro || LINEAR || H || align=right data-sort-value="0.63" | 630 m || 
|-id=566 bgcolor=#fefefe
| 500566 ||  || — || October 21, 2012 || Haleakala || Pan-STARRS || H || align=right data-sort-value="0.47" | 470 m || 
|-id=567 bgcolor=#d6d6d6
| 500567 ||  || — || October 21, 2006 || Mount Lemmon || Mount Lemmon Survey ||  || align=right | 2.4 km || 
|-id=568 bgcolor=#d6d6d6
| 500568 ||  || — || September 17, 2006 || Kitt Peak || Spacewatch ||  || align=right | 2.6 km || 
|-id=569 bgcolor=#d6d6d6
| 500569 ||  || — || September 15, 2006 || Kitt Peak || Spacewatch || THM || align=right | 2.0 km || 
|-id=570 bgcolor=#fefefe
| 500570 ||  || — || September 18, 2012 || Kitt Peak || Spacewatch || H || align=right data-sort-value="0.70" | 700 m || 
|-id=571 bgcolor=#d6d6d6
| 500571 ||  || — || October 8, 2007 || Mount Lemmon || Mount Lemmon Survey ||  || align=right | 2.0 km || 
|-id=572 bgcolor=#d6d6d6
| 500572 ||  || — || August 21, 2006 || Kitt Peak || Spacewatch ||  || align=right | 2.9 km || 
|-id=573 bgcolor=#d6d6d6
| 500573 ||  || — || October 14, 2012 || Kitt Peak || Spacewatch || HYG || align=right | 2.9 km || 
|-id=574 bgcolor=#d6d6d6
| 500574 ||  || — || September 21, 1995 || Kitt Peak || Spacewatch || HYG || align=right | 2.3 km || 
|-id=575 bgcolor=#d6d6d6
| 500575 ||  || — || October 6, 2012 || Kitt Peak || Spacewatch || EOS || align=right | 2.0 km || 
|-id=576 bgcolor=#d6d6d6
| 500576 ||  || — || October 20, 2007 || Mount Lemmon || Mount Lemmon Survey ||  || align=right | 2.1 km || 
|-id=577 bgcolor=#d6d6d6
| 500577 ||  || — || July 28, 2011 || Haleakala || Pan-STARRS || EOS || align=right | 2.4 km || 
|-id=578 bgcolor=#d6d6d6
| 500578 ||  || — || July 25, 2011 || Haleakala || Pan-STARRS || EOS || align=right | 1.7 km || 
|-id=579 bgcolor=#d6d6d6
| 500579 ||  || — || July 7, 2010 || WISE || WISE ||  || align=right | 4.0 km || 
|-id=580 bgcolor=#d6d6d6
| 500580 ||  || — || July 31, 2011 || Haleakala || Pan-STARRS || HYG || align=right | 2.6 km || 
|-id=581 bgcolor=#d6d6d6
| 500581 ||  || — || September 30, 2006 || Kitt Peak || Spacewatch ||  || align=right | 2.3 km || 
|-id=582 bgcolor=#d6d6d6
| 500582 ||  || — || October 21, 2012 || Haleakala || Pan-STARRS || THM || align=right | 1.9 km || 
|-id=583 bgcolor=#d6d6d6
| 500583 ||  || — || December 17, 2007 || Kitt Peak || Spacewatch || THM || align=right | 1.9 km || 
|-id=584 bgcolor=#fefefe
| 500584 ||  || — || October 21, 2012 || Haleakala || Pan-STARRS ||  || align=right data-sort-value="0.86" | 860 m || 
|-id=585 bgcolor=#d6d6d6
| 500585 ||  || — || October 8, 2012 || Haleakala || Pan-STARRS || EOS || align=right | 2.7 km || 
|-id=586 bgcolor=#d6d6d6
| 500586 ||  || — || September 25, 2012 || Mount Lemmon || Mount Lemmon Survey ||  || align=right | 2.9 km || 
|-id=587 bgcolor=#d6d6d6
| 500587 ||  || — || September 16, 2012 || Mount Lemmon || Mount Lemmon Survey ||  || align=right | 2.3 km || 
|-id=588 bgcolor=#d6d6d6
| 500588 ||  || — || October 6, 2012 || Mount Lemmon || Mount Lemmon Survey ||  || align=right | 2.3 km || 
|-id=589 bgcolor=#d6d6d6
| 500589 ||  || — || October 7, 2012 || Kitt Peak || Spacewatch ||  || align=right | 2.2 km || 
|-id=590 bgcolor=#d6d6d6
| 500590 ||  || — || August 30, 2011 || Haleakala || Pan-STARRS ||  || align=right | 2.6 km || 
|-id=591 bgcolor=#d6d6d6
| 500591 ||  || — || November 13, 2007 || Mount Lemmon || Mount Lemmon Survey ||  || align=right | 2.5 km || 
|-id=592 bgcolor=#d6d6d6
| 500592 ||  || — || October 19, 2012 || Mount Lemmon || Mount Lemmon Survey ||  || align=right | 3.0 km || 
|-id=593 bgcolor=#d6d6d6
| 500593 ||  || — || October 14, 2001 || Socorro || LINEAR || EOS || align=right | 2.0 km || 
|-id=594 bgcolor=#d6d6d6
| 500594 ||  || — || September 19, 2012 || Mount Lemmon || Mount Lemmon Survey ||  || align=right | 2.7 km || 
|-id=595 bgcolor=#d6d6d6
| 500595 ||  || — || April 16, 2008 || Mount Lemmon || Mount Lemmon Survey ||  || align=right | 4.1 km || 
|-id=596 bgcolor=#d6d6d6
| 500596 ||  || — || October 7, 2012 || Kitt Peak || Spacewatch ||  || align=right | 2.3 km || 
|-id=597 bgcolor=#fefefe
| 500597 ||  || — || October 8, 2012 || Kitt Peak || Spacewatch || H || align=right data-sort-value="0.56" | 560 m || 
|-id=598 bgcolor=#d6d6d6
| 500598 ||  || — || September 11, 2001 || Kitt Peak || Spacewatch || HYG || align=right | 2.3 km || 
|-id=599 bgcolor=#d6d6d6
| 500599 ||  || — || August 27, 2006 || Kitt Peak || Spacewatch ||  || align=right | 2.3 km || 
|-id=600 bgcolor=#d6d6d6
| 500600 ||  || — || October 15, 2012 || Kitt Peak || Spacewatch || Tj (2.99) || align=right | 3.3 km || 
|}

500601–500700 

|-bgcolor=#d6d6d6
| 500601 ||  || — || November 19, 2007 || Mount Lemmon || Mount Lemmon Survey || EOS || align=right | 2.8 km || 
|-id=602 bgcolor=#d6d6d6
| 500602 ||  || — || November 13, 2007 || Kitt Peak || Spacewatch ||  || align=right | 2.7 km || 
|-id=603 bgcolor=#d6d6d6
| 500603 ||  || — || March 18, 2010 || Kitt Peak || Spacewatch ||  || align=right | 3.1 km || 
|-id=604 bgcolor=#d6d6d6
| 500604 ||  || — || November 19, 2001 || Socorro || LINEAR || EOS || align=right | 1.9 km || 
|-id=605 bgcolor=#d6d6d6
| 500605 ||  || — || October 22, 2012 || Haleakala || Pan-STARRS || EOS || align=right | 2.0 km || 
|-id=606 bgcolor=#d6d6d6
| 500606 ||  || — || March 17, 2009 || Kitt Peak || Spacewatch || URS || align=right | 2.7 km || 
|-id=607 bgcolor=#d6d6d6
| 500607 ||  || — || January 23, 1998 || Kitt Peak || Spacewatch ||  || align=right | 2.5 km || 
|-id=608 bgcolor=#d6d6d6
| 500608 ||  || — || October 17, 2012 || Mount Lemmon || Mount Lemmon Survey ||  || align=right | 3.0 km || 
|-id=609 bgcolor=#d6d6d6
| 500609 ||  || — || November 20, 2007 || Catalina || CSS ||  || align=right | 2.5 km || 
|-id=610 bgcolor=#fefefe
| 500610 ||  || — || September 18, 2012 || Mount Lemmon || Mount Lemmon Survey || H || align=right data-sort-value="0.55" | 550 m || 
|-id=611 bgcolor=#d6d6d6
| 500611 ||  || — || January 18, 2009 || Kitt Peak || Spacewatch ||  || align=right | 2.7 km || 
|-id=612 bgcolor=#d6d6d6
| 500612 ||  || — || October 18, 2012 || Mount Lemmon || Mount Lemmon Survey ||  || align=right | 2.5 km || 
|-id=613 bgcolor=#d6d6d6
| 500613 ||  || — || January 31, 2009 || Kitt Peak || Spacewatch ||  || align=right | 2.9 km || 
|-id=614 bgcolor=#d6d6d6
| 500614 ||  || — || August 19, 2006 || Kitt Peak || Spacewatch || HYG || align=right | 2.1 km || 
|-id=615 bgcolor=#d6d6d6
| 500615 ||  || — || October 19, 2012 || Mount Lemmon || Mount Lemmon Survey ||  || align=right | 3.6 km || 
|-id=616 bgcolor=#d6d6d6
| 500616 ||  || — || October 19, 2012 || Mount Lemmon || Mount Lemmon Survey ||  || align=right | 3.2 km || 
|-id=617 bgcolor=#d6d6d6
| 500617 ||  || — || December 18, 2007 || Kitt Peak || Spacewatch ||  || align=right | 2.1 km || 
|-id=618 bgcolor=#fefefe
| 500618 ||  || — || March 29, 2011 || Haleakala || Pan-STARRS || H || align=right data-sort-value="0.70" | 700 m || 
|-id=619 bgcolor=#d6d6d6
| 500619 ||  || — || March 19, 2009 || Kitt Peak || Spacewatch || LIX || align=right | 3.1 km || 
|-id=620 bgcolor=#d6d6d6
| 500620 ||  || — || August 28, 2012 || Mount Lemmon || Mount Lemmon Survey ||  || align=right | 2.7 km || 
|-id=621 bgcolor=#d6d6d6
| 500621 ||  || — || December 31, 2007 || Kitt Peak || Spacewatch ||  || align=right | 1.8 km || 
|-id=622 bgcolor=#d6d6d6
| 500622 ||  || — || October 13, 2012 || Kitt Peak || Spacewatch ||  || align=right | 2.2 km || 
|-id=623 bgcolor=#d6d6d6
| 500623 ||  || — || October 11, 2012 || Haleakala || Pan-STARRS || THM || align=right | 1.9 km || 
|-id=624 bgcolor=#d6d6d6
| 500624 ||  || — || September 17, 2006 || Kitt Peak || Spacewatch || HYG || align=right | 2.9 km || 
|-id=625 bgcolor=#d6d6d6
| 500625 ||  || — || October 22, 2012 || Mount Lemmon || Mount Lemmon Survey ||  || align=right | 2.7 km || 
|-id=626 bgcolor=#d6d6d6
| 500626 ||  || — || February 3, 2009 || Kitt Peak || Spacewatch || EOS || align=right | 2.7 km || 
|-id=627 bgcolor=#d6d6d6
| 500627 ||  || — || October 17, 2012 || Mount Lemmon || Mount Lemmon Survey ||  || align=right | 3.0 km || 
|-id=628 bgcolor=#d6d6d6
| 500628 ||  || — || November 6, 2007 || Kitt Peak || Spacewatch ||  || align=right | 1.7 km || 
|-id=629 bgcolor=#d6d6d6
| 500629 ||  || — || October 13, 2012 || Kitt Peak || Spacewatch || EOS || align=right | 1.9 km || 
|-id=630 bgcolor=#d6d6d6
| 500630 ||  || — || October 21, 2006 || Kitt Peak || Spacewatch ||  || align=right | 2.6 km || 
|-id=631 bgcolor=#d6d6d6
| 500631 ||  || — || November 12, 2001 || Kitt Peak || Spacewatch || Tj (2.99) || align=right | 3.7 km || 
|-id=632 bgcolor=#d6d6d6
| 500632 ||  || — || February 21, 2009 || La Sagra || OAM Obs. ||  || align=right | 3.6 km || 
|-id=633 bgcolor=#fefefe
| 500633 ||  || — || November 17, 2001 || Socorro || LINEAR || H || align=right data-sort-value="0.67" | 670 m || 
|-id=634 bgcolor=#fefefe
| 500634 ||  || — || May 19, 2006 || Mount Lemmon || Mount Lemmon Survey || H || align=right data-sort-value="0.65" | 650 m || 
|-id=635 bgcolor=#d6d6d6
| 500635 ||  || — || October 14, 2001 || Socorro || LINEAR ||  || align=right | 3.0 km || 
|-id=636 bgcolor=#d6d6d6
| 500636 ||  || — || October 6, 2012 || Haleakala || Pan-STARRS ||  || align=right | 2.5 km || 
|-id=637 bgcolor=#d6d6d6
| 500637 ||  || — || November 2, 2012 || Haleakala || Pan-STARRS || EOS || align=right | 1.4 km || 
|-id=638 bgcolor=#FA8072
| 500638 ||  || — || June 23, 2012 || Siding Spring || SSS ||  || align=right data-sort-value="0.76" | 760 m || 
|-id=639 bgcolor=#fefefe
| 500639 ||  || — || September 7, 2004 || Kitt Peak || Spacewatch || H || align=right data-sort-value="0.56" | 560 m || 
|-id=640 bgcolor=#fefefe
| 500640 ||  || — || October 16, 2012 || Kitt Peak || Spacewatch || H || align=right data-sort-value="0.75" | 750 m || 
|-id=641 bgcolor=#d6d6d6
| 500641 ||  || — || October 20, 2012 || Kitt Peak || Spacewatch ||  || align=right | 2.5 km || 
|-id=642 bgcolor=#d6d6d6
| 500642 ||  || — || October 6, 2012 || Haleakala || Pan-STARRS ||  || align=right | 2.6 km || 
|-id=643 bgcolor=#d6d6d6
| 500643 ||  || — || October 9, 2012 || Mount Lemmon || Mount Lemmon Survey || EOS || align=right | 3.5 km || 
|-id=644 bgcolor=#d6d6d6
| 500644 ||  || — || September 15, 2006 || Kitt Peak || Spacewatch ||  || align=right | 2.4 km || 
|-id=645 bgcolor=#d6d6d6
| 500645 ||  || — || October 18, 2012 || Haleakala || Pan-STARRS || HYG || align=right | 2.3 km || 
|-id=646 bgcolor=#d6d6d6
| 500646 ||  || — || October 18, 2012 || Haleakala || Pan-STARRS || THM || align=right | 1.9 km || 
|-id=647 bgcolor=#d6d6d6
| 500647 ||  || — || October 18, 2012 || Haleakala || Pan-STARRS ||  || align=right | 3.5 km || 
|-id=648 bgcolor=#d6d6d6
| 500648 ||  || — || October 17, 2001 || Kitt Peak || Spacewatch || THM || align=right | 1.7 km || 
|-id=649 bgcolor=#d6d6d6
| 500649 ||  || — || November 2, 2007 || Kitt Peak || Spacewatch || THM || align=right | 1.7 km || 
|-id=650 bgcolor=#d6d6d6
| 500650 ||  || — || December 17, 2007 || Mount Lemmon || Mount Lemmon Survey ||  || align=right | 2.4 km || 
|-id=651 bgcolor=#d6d6d6
| 500651 ||  || — || October 6, 2012 || Haleakala || Pan-STARRS ||  || align=right | 2.6 km || 
|-id=652 bgcolor=#d6d6d6
| 500652 ||  || — || September 15, 2007 || Mount Lemmon || Mount Lemmon Survey ||  || align=right | 2.4 km || 
|-id=653 bgcolor=#d6d6d6
| 500653 ||  || — || November 5, 2012 || Haleakala || Pan-STARRS ||  || align=right | 3.5 km || 
|-id=654 bgcolor=#d6d6d6
| 500654 ||  || — || November 6, 2012 || Mount Lemmon || Mount Lemmon Survey ||  || align=right | 2.3 km || 
|-id=655 bgcolor=#d6d6d6
| 500655 ||  || — || September 15, 2006 || Kitt Peak || Spacewatch || HYG || align=right | 2.4 km || 
|-id=656 bgcolor=#d6d6d6
| 500656 ||  || — || November 8, 2007 || Mount Lemmon || Mount Lemmon Survey ||  || align=right | 2.1 km || 
|-id=657 bgcolor=#d6d6d6
| 500657 ||  || — || July 18, 2006 || Siding Spring || SSS ||  || align=right | 2.9 km || 
|-id=658 bgcolor=#d6d6d6
| 500658 ||  || — || August 27, 2006 || Kitt Peak || Spacewatch || THM || align=right | 2.0 km || 
|-id=659 bgcolor=#d6d6d6
| 500659 ||  || — || September 25, 2012 || Mount Lemmon || Mount Lemmon Survey || EOS || align=right | 1.6 km || 
|-id=660 bgcolor=#d6d6d6
| 500660 ||  || — || December 30, 2007 || Mount Lemmon || Mount Lemmon Survey || THM || align=right | 2.3 km || 
|-id=661 bgcolor=#d6d6d6
| 500661 ||  || — || December 17, 2007 || Kitt Peak || Spacewatch || THM || align=right | 1.7 km || 
|-id=662 bgcolor=#d6d6d6
| 500662 ||  || — || September 17, 2006 || Kitt Peak || Spacewatch ||  || align=right | 2.4 km || 
|-id=663 bgcolor=#d6d6d6
| 500663 ||  || — || October 11, 2012 || Haleakala || Pan-STARRS ||  || align=right | 2.7 km || 
|-id=664 bgcolor=#d6d6d6
| 500664 ||  || — || November 14, 2007 || Kitt Peak || Spacewatch ||  || align=right | 1.9 km || 
|-id=665 bgcolor=#fefefe
| 500665 ||  || — || May 2, 2006 || Mount Lemmon || Mount Lemmon Survey || H || align=right data-sort-value="0.41" | 410 m || 
|-id=666 bgcolor=#d6d6d6
| 500666 ||  || — || October 15, 2007 || Kitt Peak || Spacewatch ||  || align=right | 2.0 km || 
|-id=667 bgcolor=#d6d6d6
| 500667 ||  || — || October 11, 2012 || Haleakala || Pan-STARRS ||  || align=right | 3.1 km || 
|-id=668 bgcolor=#d6d6d6
| 500668 ||  || — || August 21, 2006 || Kitt Peak || Spacewatch ||  || align=right | 1.8 km || 
|-id=669 bgcolor=#d6d6d6
| 500669 ||  || — || November 5, 2012 || Haleakala || Pan-STARRS || EOS || align=right | 1.9 km || 
|-id=670 bgcolor=#d6d6d6
| 500670 ||  || — || October 22, 2012 || Haleakala || Pan-STARRS || EOS || align=right | 2.1 km || 
|-id=671 bgcolor=#d6d6d6
| 500671 ||  || — || January 1, 2008 || Mount Lemmon || Mount Lemmon Survey ||  || align=right | 3.0 km || 
|-id=672 bgcolor=#d6d6d6
| 500672 ||  || — || August 1, 2011 || Haleakala || Pan-STARRS ||  || align=right | 3.5 km || 
|-id=673 bgcolor=#d6d6d6
| 500673 ||  || — || February 20, 2009 || Kitt Peak || Spacewatch ||  || align=right | 2.8 km || 
|-id=674 bgcolor=#d6d6d6
| 500674 ||  || — || December 4, 2007 || Mount Lemmon || Mount Lemmon Survey || THM || align=right | 2.1 km || 
|-id=675 bgcolor=#d6d6d6
| 500675 ||  || — || September 19, 2006 || Kitt Peak || Spacewatch || HYG || align=right | 2.4 km || 
|-id=676 bgcolor=#d6d6d6
| 500676 ||  || — || December 18, 2007 || Kitt Peak || Spacewatch ||  || align=right | 1.9 km || 
|-id=677 bgcolor=#d6d6d6
| 500677 ||  || — || December 21, 2007 || Mount Lemmon || Mount Lemmon Survey ||  || align=right | 2.7 km || 
|-id=678 bgcolor=#d6d6d6
| 500678 ||  || — || October 18, 2012 || Haleakala || Pan-STARRS || HYG || align=right | 2.6 km || 
|-id=679 bgcolor=#d6d6d6
| 500679 ||  || — || October 20, 2007 || Mount Lemmon || Mount Lemmon Survey ||  || align=right | 2.4 km || 
|-id=680 bgcolor=#d6d6d6
| 500680 ||  || — || September 19, 2006 || Kitt Peak || Spacewatch ||  || align=right | 2.5 km || 
|-id=681 bgcolor=#d6d6d6
| 500681 ||  || — || December 18, 2001 || Socorro || LINEAR ||  || align=right | 2.9 km || 
|-id=682 bgcolor=#d6d6d6
| 500682 ||  || — || October 21, 2012 || Haleakala || Pan-STARRS ||  || align=right | 2.6 km || 
|-id=683 bgcolor=#d6d6d6
| 500683 ||  || — || October 21, 2012 || Haleakala || Pan-STARRS ||  || align=right | 2.9 km || 
|-id=684 bgcolor=#d6d6d6
| 500684 ||  || — || March 27, 2009 || Mount Lemmon || Mount Lemmon Survey ||  || align=right | 2.9 km || 
|-id=685 bgcolor=#d6d6d6
| 500685 ||  || — || November 15, 1995 || Kitt Peak || Spacewatch ||  || align=right | 2.8 km || 
|-id=686 bgcolor=#d6d6d6
| 500686 ||  || — || November 20, 2001 || Socorro || LINEAR ||  || align=right | 2.5 km || 
|-id=687 bgcolor=#d6d6d6
| 500687 ||  || — || September 17, 2006 || Kitt Peak || Spacewatch ||  || align=right | 2.7 km || 
|-id=688 bgcolor=#d6d6d6
| 500688 ||  || — || September 28, 2006 || Mount Lemmon || Mount Lemmon Survey ||  || align=right | 2.7 km || 
|-id=689 bgcolor=#d6d6d6
| 500689 ||  || — || August 26, 2011 || Haleakala || Pan-STARRS ||  || align=right | 2.9 km || 
|-id=690 bgcolor=#d6d6d6
| 500690 ||  || — || November 2, 2007 || Mount Lemmon || Mount Lemmon Survey ||  || align=right | 2.7 km || 
|-id=691 bgcolor=#d6d6d6
| 500691 ||  || — || October 21, 2001 || Kitt Peak || Spacewatch ||  || align=right | 2.8 km || 
|-id=692 bgcolor=#d6d6d6
| 500692 ||  || — || October 16, 2012 || Kitt Peak || Spacewatch ||  || align=right | 2.3 km || 
|-id=693 bgcolor=#d6d6d6
| 500693 ||  || — || September 20, 2011 || Haleakala || Pan-STARRS ||  || align=right | 4.0 km || 
|-id=694 bgcolor=#fefefe
| 500694 ||  || — || April 21, 2006 || Kitt Peak || Spacewatch || H || align=right data-sort-value="0.72" | 720 m || 
|-id=695 bgcolor=#d6d6d6
| 500695 ||  || — || August 28, 2006 || Kitt Peak || Spacewatch ||  || align=right | 1.6 km || 
|-id=696 bgcolor=#d6d6d6
| 500696 ||  || — || November 11, 2007 || Mount Lemmon || Mount Lemmon Survey ||  || align=right | 2.2 km || 
|-id=697 bgcolor=#d6d6d6
| 500697 ||  || — || August 21, 2006 || Kitt Peak || Spacewatch || THM || align=right | 2.2 km || 
|-id=698 bgcolor=#d6d6d6
| 500698 ||  || — || November 13, 2012 || Mount Lemmon || Mount Lemmon Survey || EUP || align=right | 3.2 km || 
|-id=699 bgcolor=#d6d6d6
| 500699 ||  || — || November 1, 2006 || Mount Lemmon || Mount Lemmon Survey ||  || align=right | 2.3 km || 
|-id=700 bgcolor=#d6d6d6
| 500700 ||  || — || December 31, 2007 || Kitt Peak || Spacewatch || THM || align=right | 1.9 km || 
|}

500701–500800 

|-bgcolor=#d6d6d6
| 500701 ||  || — || November 17, 2012 || Kitt Peak || Spacewatch || EOS || align=right | 1.4 km || 
|-id=702 bgcolor=#d6d6d6
| 500702 ||  || — || August 27, 2006 || Kitt Peak || Spacewatch ||  || align=right | 2.4 km || 
|-id=703 bgcolor=#fefefe
| 500703 ||  || — || October 23, 2012 || Mount Lemmon || Mount Lemmon Survey || H || align=right data-sort-value="0.80" | 800 m || 
|-id=704 bgcolor=#d6d6d6
| 500704 ||  || — || October 9, 2012 || Mount Lemmon || Mount Lemmon Survey || EUP || align=right | 3.7 km || 
|-id=705 bgcolor=#d6d6d6
| 500705 ||  || — || October 26, 2012 || Mount Lemmon || Mount Lemmon Survey ||  || align=right | 2.3 km || 
|-id=706 bgcolor=#d6d6d6
| 500706 ||  || — || December 28, 2007 || Kitt Peak || Spacewatch ||  || align=right | 2.0 km || 
|-id=707 bgcolor=#d6d6d6
| 500707 ||  || — || October 22, 2012 || Haleakala || Pan-STARRS ||  || align=right | 2.9 km || 
|-id=708 bgcolor=#d6d6d6
| 500708 ||  || — || October 23, 2012 || Mount Lemmon || Mount Lemmon Survey || EOS || align=right | 2.9 km || 
|-id=709 bgcolor=#d6d6d6
| 500709 ||  || — || October 20, 2006 || Kitt Peak || Spacewatch || HYG || align=right | 2.5 km || 
|-id=710 bgcolor=#d6d6d6
| 500710 ||  || — || February 26, 2008 || Mount Lemmon || Mount Lemmon Survey || THM || align=right | 1.8 km || 
|-id=711 bgcolor=#fefefe
| 500711 ||  || — || December 3, 2012 || Mount Lemmon || Mount Lemmon Survey || H || align=right data-sort-value="0.69" | 690 m || 
|-id=712 bgcolor=#d6d6d6
| 500712 ||  || — || October 21, 2012 || Kitt Peak || Spacewatch ||  || align=right | 2.7 km || 
|-id=713 bgcolor=#d6d6d6
| 500713 ||  || — || November 4, 2012 || Kitt Peak || Spacewatch ||  || align=right | 3.2 km || 
|-id=714 bgcolor=#d6d6d6
| 500714 ||  || — || November 16, 1995 || Kitt Peak || Spacewatch || EUP || align=right | 3.1 km || 
|-id=715 bgcolor=#fefefe
| 500715 ||  || — || December 7, 2012 || Haleakala || Pan-STARRS || H || align=right data-sort-value="0.56" | 560 m || 
|-id=716 bgcolor=#d6d6d6
| 500716 ||  || — || September 28, 2006 || Mount Lemmon || Mount Lemmon Survey || THM || align=right | 1.8 km || 
|-id=717 bgcolor=#d6d6d6
| 500717 ||  || — || December 16, 2007 || Mount Lemmon || Mount Lemmon Survey || VER || align=right | 3.1 km || 
|-id=718 bgcolor=#d6d6d6
| 500718 ||  || — || October 27, 2012 || Mount Lemmon || Mount Lemmon Survey || EOS || align=right | 3.6 km || 
|-id=719 bgcolor=#d6d6d6
| 500719 ||  || — || August 26, 2011 || Haleakala || Pan-STARRS || EOS || align=right | 2.6 km || 
|-id=720 bgcolor=#d6d6d6
| 500720 ||  || — || October 4, 2006 || Mount Lemmon || Mount Lemmon Survey || HYG || align=right | 2.0 km || 
|-id=721 bgcolor=#d6d6d6
| 500721 ||  || — || September 28, 2006 || Kitt Peak || Spacewatch || THM || align=right | 2.2 km || 
|-id=722 bgcolor=#d6d6d6
| 500722 ||  || — || December 4, 2007 || Kitt Peak || Spacewatch ||  || align=right | 2.2 km || 
|-id=723 bgcolor=#d6d6d6
| 500723 ||  || — || September 25, 2006 || Kitt Peak || Spacewatch || THM || align=right | 1.6 km || 
|-id=724 bgcolor=#d6d6d6
| 500724 ||  || — || November 14, 2006 || Mount Lemmon || Mount Lemmon Survey ||  || align=right | 3.2 km || 
|-id=725 bgcolor=#d6d6d6
| 500725 ||  || — || November 6, 2012 || Kitt Peak || Spacewatch || VER || align=right | 2.7 km || 
|-id=726 bgcolor=#fefefe
| 500726 ||  || — || December 4, 2012 || Kitt Peak || Spacewatch || H || align=right data-sort-value="0.86" | 860 m || 
|-id=727 bgcolor=#d6d6d6
| 500727 ||  || — || July 28, 2011 || Haleakala || Pan-STARRS ||  || align=right | 2.1 km || 
|-id=728 bgcolor=#d6d6d6
| 500728 ||  || — || October 2, 2006 || Mount Lemmon || Mount Lemmon Survey ||  || align=right | 2.4 km || 
|-id=729 bgcolor=#d6d6d6
| 500729 ||  || — || December 5, 2012 || Mount Lemmon || Mount Lemmon Survey ||  || align=right | 2.1 km || 
|-id=730 bgcolor=#d6d6d6
| 500730 ||  || — || November 7, 2012 || Haleakala || Pan-STARRS || EOS || align=right | 1.8 km || 
|-id=731 bgcolor=#d6d6d6
| 500731 ||  || — || January 27, 1998 || Kitt Peak || Spacewatch ||  || align=right | 2.3 km || 
|-id=732 bgcolor=#d6d6d6
| 500732 ||  || — || October 2, 2006 || Mount Lemmon || Mount Lemmon Survey ||  || align=right | 2.9 km || 
|-id=733 bgcolor=#d6d6d6
| 500733 ||  || — || November 11, 2006 || Socorro || LINEAR || EUP || align=right | 4.5 km || 
|-id=734 bgcolor=#fefefe
| 500734 ||  || — || September 23, 2012 || Mount Lemmon || Mount Lemmon Survey || H || align=right data-sort-value="0.78" | 780 m || 
|-id=735 bgcolor=#d6d6d6
| 500735 ||  || — || September 14, 2006 || Kitt Peak || Spacewatch ||  || align=right | 2.2 km || 
|-id=736 bgcolor=#d6d6d6
| 500736 ||  || — || August 29, 2006 || Kitt Peak || Spacewatch ||  || align=right | 2.1 km || 
|-id=737 bgcolor=#d6d6d6
| 500737 ||  || — || November 5, 1996 || Kitt Peak || Spacewatch ||  || align=right | 2.0 km || 
|-id=738 bgcolor=#d6d6d6
| 500738 ||  || — || December 14, 2001 || Kitt Peak || Spacewatch || TIR || align=right | 3.4 km || 
|-id=739 bgcolor=#d6d6d6
| 500739 ||  || — || November 22, 2006 || Catalina || CSS || ALA || align=right | 4.6 km || 
|-id=740 bgcolor=#d6d6d6
| 500740 ||  || — || January 15, 2008 || Mount Lemmon || Mount Lemmon Survey || HYG || align=right | 2.6 km || 
|-id=741 bgcolor=#d6d6d6
| 500741 ||  || — || December 6, 2012 || Mount Lemmon || Mount Lemmon Survey ||  || align=right | 2.2 km || 
|-id=742 bgcolor=#d6d6d6
| 500742 ||  || — || December 9, 2012 || Haleakala || Pan-STARRS || EOS || align=right | 2.4 km || 
|-id=743 bgcolor=#FA8072
| 500743 ||  || — || December 29, 2012 || Haleakala || Pan-STARRS || H || align=right data-sort-value="0.62" | 620 m || 
|-id=744 bgcolor=#fefefe
| 500744 ||  || — || December 13, 2012 || Catalina || CSS ||  || align=right data-sort-value="0.89" | 890 m || 
|-id=745 bgcolor=#d6d6d6
| 500745 ||  || — || January 27, 2007 || Kitt Peak || Spacewatch || 7:4* || align=right | 2.9 km || 
|-id=746 bgcolor=#fefefe
| 500746 ||  || — || December 9, 2012 || Mount Lemmon || Mount Lemmon Survey || H || align=right data-sort-value="0.46" | 460 m || 
|-id=747 bgcolor=#d6d6d6
| 500747 ||  || — || November 24, 2006 || Kitt Peak || Spacewatch ||  || align=right | 2.8 km || 
|-id=748 bgcolor=#fefefe
| 500748 ||  || — || January 5, 2013 || Kitt Peak || Spacewatch || H || align=right data-sort-value="0.52" | 520 m || 
|-id=749 bgcolor=#FFC2E0
| 500749 ||  || — || January 9, 2013 || Catalina || CSS || APO +1km || align=right | 1.5 km || 
|-id=750 bgcolor=#fefefe
| 500750 ||  || — || January 8, 2013 || Haleakala || Pan-STARRS || H || align=right data-sort-value="0.59" | 590 m || 
|-id=751 bgcolor=#d6d6d6
| 500751 ||  || — || December 11, 2012 || Kitt Peak || Spacewatch ||  || align=right | 2.8 km || 
|-id=752 bgcolor=#fefefe
| 500752 ||  || — || January 7, 2013 || Catalina || CSS || H || align=right data-sort-value="0.63" | 630 m || 
|-id=753 bgcolor=#d6d6d6
| 500753 ||  || — || October 3, 2006 || Catalina || CSS || TIR || align=right | 2.9 km || 
|-id=754 bgcolor=#d6d6d6
| 500754 ||  || — || September 26, 2000 || Socorro || LINEAR || TIR || align=right | 3.0 km || 
|-id=755 bgcolor=#d6d6d6
| 500755 ||  || — || September 24, 2011 || Haleakala || Pan-STARRS ||  || align=right | 3.6 km || 
|-id=756 bgcolor=#fefefe
| 500756 ||  || — || January 3, 2013 || Haleakala || Pan-STARRS || H || align=right data-sort-value="0.73" | 730 m || 
|-id=757 bgcolor=#d6d6d6
| 500757 ||  || — || September 8, 2011 || Haleakala || Pan-STARRS ||  || align=right | 2.6 km || 
|-id=758 bgcolor=#fefefe
| 500758 ||  || — || January 5, 2013 || Mount Lemmon || Mount Lemmon Survey || H || align=right data-sort-value="0.81" | 810 m || 
|-id=759 bgcolor=#fefefe
| 500759 ||  || — || December 9, 2009 || La Sagra || OAM Obs. || H || align=right data-sort-value="0.68" | 680 m || 
|-id=760 bgcolor=#d6d6d6
| 500760 ||  || — || October 28, 2006 || Catalina || CSS ||  || align=right | 2.6 km || 
|-id=761 bgcolor=#fefefe
| 500761 ||  || — || January 7, 2010 || Mount Lemmon || Mount Lemmon Survey || H || align=right data-sort-value="0.65" | 650 m || 
|-id=762 bgcolor=#fefefe
| 500762 ||  || — || September 27, 2012 || Haleakala || Pan-STARRS || H || align=right data-sort-value="0.85" | 850 m || 
|-id=763 bgcolor=#fefefe
| 500763 ||  || — || March 10, 2008 || Mount Lemmon || Mount Lemmon Survey || H || align=right data-sort-value="0.78" | 780 m || 
|-id=764 bgcolor=#fefefe
| 500764 ||  || — || January 20, 2013 || Kitt Peak || Spacewatch || H || align=right data-sort-value="0.58" | 580 m || 
|-id=765 bgcolor=#fefefe
| 500765 ||  || — || September 27, 2012 || Haleakala || Pan-STARRS || H || align=right data-sort-value="0.55" | 550 m || 
|-id=766 bgcolor=#fefefe
| 500766 ||  || — || March 4, 2010 || Kitt Peak || Spacewatch ||  || align=right data-sort-value="0.50" | 500 m || 
|-id=767 bgcolor=#fefefe
| 500767 ||  || — || January 23, 2006 || Kitt Peak || Spacewatch ||  || align=right data-sort-value="0.65" | 650 m || 
|-id=768 bgcolor=#fefefe
| 500768 ||  || — || April 9, 2010 || Mount Lemmon || Mount Lemmon Survey ||  || align=right data-sort-value="0.50" | 500 m || 
|-id=769 bgcolor=#FA8072
| 500769 ||  || — || January 4, 2006 || Kitt Peak || Spacewatch ||  || align=right data-sort-value="0.77" | 770 m || 
|-id=770 bgcolor=#d6d6d6
| 500770 ||  || — || August 27, 2011 || Haleakala || Pan-STARRS || THB || align=right | 2.4 km || 
|-id=771 bgcolor=#fefefe
| 500771 ||  || — || February 12, 2013 || Haleakala || Pan-STARRS ||  || align=right data-sort-value="0.69" | 690 m || 
|-id=772 bgcolor=#fefefe
| 500772 ||  || — || February 25, 2006 || Kitt Peak || Spacewatch || NYS || align=right data-sort-value="0.68" | 680 m || 
|-id=773 bgcolor=#d6d6d6
| 500773 ||  || — || February 14, 2013 || Haleakala || Pan-STARRS || SHU3:2 || align=right | 5.0 km || 
|-id=774 bgcolor=#fefefe
| 500774 ||  || — || August 31, 2011 || Haleakala || Pan-STARRS ||  || align=right data-sort-value="0.82" | 820 m || 
|-id=775 bgcolor=#d6d6d6
| 500775 ||  || — || October 28, 2006 || Mount Lemmon || Mount Lemmon Survey ||  || align=right | 3.1 km || 
|-id=776 bgcolor=#fefefe
| 500776 ||  || — || January 25, 2006 || Kitt Peak || Spacewatch ||  || align=right data-sort-value="0.59" | 590 m || 
|-id=777 bgcolor=#fefefe
| 500777 ||  || — || September 2, 2007 || Mount Lemmon || Mount Lemmon Survey ||  || align=right data-sort-value="0.87" | 870 m || 
|-id=778 bgcolor=#fefefe
| 500778 ||  || — || February 24, 2010 || WISE || WISE ||  || align=right | 1.4 km || 
|-id=779 bgcolor=#d6d6d6
| 500779 ||  || — || November 25, 2006 || Siding Spring || SSS || Tj (2.93) || align=right | 2.9 km || 
|-id=780 bgcolor=#fefefe
| 500780 ||  || — || February 5, 2013 || Kitt Peak || Spacewatch ||  || align=right data-sort-value="0.63" | 630 m || 
|-id=781 bgcolor=#fefefe
| 500781 ||  || — || May 6, 2006 || Mount Lemmon || Mount Lemmon Survey ||  || align=right data-sort-value="0.58" | 580 m || 
|-id=782 bgcolor=#fefefe
| 500782 ||  || — || May 3, 2006 || Mount Lemmon || Mount Lemmon Survey || MAS || align=right data-sort-value="0.54" | 540 m || 
|-id=783 bgcolor=#d6d6d6
| 500783 ||  || — || March 6, 2013 || Haleakala || Pan-STARRS || 3:2 || align=right | 5.1 km || 
|-id=784 bgcolor=#C2FFFF
| 500784 ||  || — || March 6, 2013 || Haleakala || Pan-STARRS || L4 || align=right | 6.3 km || 
|-id=785 bgcolor=#fefefe
| 500785 ||  || — || April 15, 2010 || Mount Lemmon || Mount Lemmon Survey ||  || align=right data-sort-value="0.49" | 490 m || 
|-id=786 bgcolor=#d6d6d6
| 500786 ||  || — || November 25, 2005 || Mount Lemmon || Mount Lemmon Survey || 7:4 || align=right | 3.4 km || 
|-id=787 bgcolor=#FA8072
| 500787 ||  || — || October 11, 2007 || Kitt Peak || Spacewatch ||  || align=right data-sort-value="0.97" | 970 m || 
|-id=788 bgcolor=#FA8072
| 500788 ||  || — || February 4, 2006 || Catalina || CSS ||  || align=right data-sort-value="0.86" | 860 m || 
|-id=789 bgcolor=#fefefe
| 500789 ||  || — || October 25, 2011 || Haleakala || Pan-STARRS ||  || align=right data-sort-value="0.84" | 840 m || 
|-id=790 bgcolor=#fefefe
| 500790 ||  || — || October 25, 2008 || Mount Lemmon || Mount Lemmon Survey ||  || align=right data-sort-value="0.68" | 680 m || 
|-id=791 bgcolor=#FA8072
| 500791 ||  || — || October 10, 2007 || Kitt Peak || Spacewatch ||  || align=right data-sort-value="0.68" | 680 m || 
|-id=792 bgcolor=#fefefe
| 500792 ||  || — || April 11, 2010 || WISE || WISE || PHO || align=right | 2.0 km || 
|-id=793 bgcolor=#fefefe
| 500793 ||  || — || March 2, 2013 || Haleakala || Pan-STARRS ||  || align=right data-sort-value="0.80" | 800 m || 
|-id=794 bgcolor=#fefefe
| 500794 ||  || — || March 17, 2013 || Kitt Peak || Spacewatch ||  || align=right data-sort-value="0.66" | 660 m || 
|-id=795 bgcolor=#fefefe
| 500795 ||  || — || March 13, 2013 || Kitt Peak || Spacewatch ||  || align=right data-sort-value="0.59" | 590 m || 
|-id=796 bgcolor=#fefefe
| 500796 ||  || — || March 14, 2013 || Catalina || CSS ||  || align=right data-sort-value="0.84" | 840 m || 
|-id=797 bgcolor=#fefefe
| 500797 ||  || — || May 17, 2010 || Kitt Peak || Spacewatch ||  || align=right data-sort-value="0.59" | 590 m || 
|-id=798 bgcolor=#fefefe
| 500798 ||  || — || April 19, 2006 || Kitt Peak || Spacewatch ||  || align=right data-sort-value="0.72" | 720 m || 
|-id=799 bgcolor=#fefefe
| 500799 ||  || — || February 20, 2006 || Kitt Peak || Spacewatch ||  || align=right data-sort-value="0.52" | 520 m || 
|-id=800 bgcolor=#fefefe
| 500800 ||  || — || May 2, 2003 || Kitt Peak || Spacewatch ||  || align=right data-sort-value="0.57" | 570 m || 
|}

500801–500900 

|-bgcolor=#fefefe
| 500801 ||  || — || April 4, 2013 || Haleakala || Pan-STARRS || H || align=right data-sort-value="0.71" | 710 m || 
|-id=802 bgcolor=#fefefe
| 500802 ||  || — || March 14, 2013 || Kitt Peak || Spacewatch ||  || align=right data-sort-value="0.61" | 610 m || 
|-id=803 bgcolor=#fefefe
| 500803 ||  || — || March 15, 2013 || Kitt Peak || Spacewatch ||  || align=right | 1.0 km || 
|-id=804 bgcolor=#fefefe
| 500804 ||  || — || February 3, 2006 || Kitt Peak || Spacewatch ||  || align=right data-sort-value="0.50" | 500 m || 
|-id=805 bgcolor=#d6d6d6
| 500805 ||  || — || September 29, 2005 || Kitt Peak || Spacewatch ||  || align=right | 3.1 km || 
|-id=806 bgcolor=#fefefe
| 500806 ||  || — || January 16, 2009 || Kitt Peak || Spacewatch ||  || align=right data-sort-value="0.84" | 840 m || 
|-id=807 bgcolor=#fefefe
| 500807 ||  || — || October 26, 2011 || Haleakala || Pan-STARRS ||  || align=right data-sort-value="0.60" | 600 m || 
|-id=808 bgcolor=#fefefe
| 500808 ||  || — || March 16, 2013 || Kitt Peak || Spacewatch ||  || align=right data-sort-value="0.60" | 600 m || 
|-id=809 bgcolor=#fefefe
| 500809 ||  || — || July 13, 2010 || La Sagra || OAM Obs. ||  || align=right data-sort-value="0.83" | 830 m || 
|-id=810 bgcolor=#fefefe
| 500810 ||  || — || April 7, 2006 || Kitt Peak || Spacewatch ||  || align=right data-sort-value="0.61" | 610 m || 
|-id=811 bgcolor=#fefefe
| 500811 ||  || — || March 13, 2013 || Kitt Peak || Spacewatch ||  || align=right data-sort-value="0.58" | 580 m || 
|-id=812 bgcolor=#fefefe
| 500812 ||  || — || October 24, 2011 || Haleakala || Pan-STARRS ||  || align=right data-sort-value="0.59" | 590 m || 
|-id=813 bgcolor=#fefefe
| 500813 ||  || — || June 19, 2010 || Mount Lemmon || Mount Lemmon Survey ||  || align=right data-sort-value="0.54" | 540 m || 
|-id=814 bgcolor=#fefefe
| 500814 ||  || — || April 9, 2013 || Haleakala || Pan-STARRS ||  || align=right data-sort-value="0.67" | 670 m || 
|-id=815 bgcolor=#FA8072
| 500815 ||  || — || September 10, 2007 || Kitt Peak || Spacewatch ||  || align=right data-sort-value="0.68" | 680 m || 
|-id=816 bgcolor=#fefefe
| 500816 ||  || — || June 21, 2010 || Mount Lemmon || Mount Lemmon Survey ||  || align=right data-sort-value="0.50" | 500 m || 
|-id=817 bgcolor=#fefefe
| 500817 ||  || — || March 5, 2013 || Haleakala || Pan-STARRS ||  || align=right data-sort-value="0.65" | 650 m || 
|-id=818 bgcolor=#fefefe
| 500818 ||  || — || April 9, 2013 || Haleakala || Pan-STARRS || NYS || align=right data-sort-value="0.58" | 580 m || 
|-id=819 bgcolor=#fefefe
| 500819 ||  || — || November 19, 2011 || Mount Lemmon || Mount Lemmon Survey ||  || align=right data-sort-value="0.61" | 610 m || 
|-id=820 bgcolor=#fefefe
| 500820 ||  || — || April 15, 2013 || Haleakala || Pan-STARRS ||  || align=right data-sort-value="0.73" | 730 m || 
|-id=821 bgcolor=#fefefe
| 500821 ||  || — || April 10, 2013 || Haleakala || Pan-STARRS ||  || align=right data-sort-value="0.90" | 900 m || 
|-id=822 bgcolor=#fefefe
| 500822 ||  || — || March 13, 2013 || Haleakala || Pan-STARRS ||  || align=right data-sort-value="0.64" | 640 m || 
|-id=823 bgcolor=#fefefe
| 500823 ||  || — || January 23, 2006 || Kitt Peak || Spacewatch ||  || align=right data-sort-value="0.54" | 540 m || 
|-id=824 bgcolor=#fefefe
| 500824 ||  || — || April 13, 2013 || Kitt Peak || Spacewatch ||  || align=right data-sort-value="0.94" | 940 m || 
|-id=825 bgcolor=#fefefe
| 500825 ||  || — || September 10, 2007 || Kitt Peak || Spacewatch ||  || align=right data-sort-value="0.65" | 650 m || 
|-id=826 bgcolor=#fefefe
| 500826 ||  || — || January 21, 2013 || Haleakala || Pan-STARRS ||  || align=right data-sort-value="0.95" | 950 m || 
|-id=827 bgcolor=#fefefe
| 500827 ||  || — || July 17, 2010 || Siding Spring || SSS ||  || align=right data-sort-value="0.71" | 710 m || 
|-id=828 bgcolor=#C2E0FF
| 500828 ||  || — || April 4, 2013 || Mauna Kea || OSSOS || res4:7critical || align=right | 122 km || 
|-id=829 bgcolor=#C2E0FF
| 500829 ||  || — || April 4, 2013 || Mauna Kea || OSSOS || cubewano?critical || align=right | 147 km || 
|-id=830 bgcolor=#C2E0FF
| 500830 ||  || — || April 4, 2013 || Mauna Kea || OSSOS || cubewano?critical || align=right | 117 km || 
|-id=831 bgcolor=#C2E0FF
| 500831 ||  || — || April 9, 2013 || Mauna Kea || OSSOS || cubewano (hot)critical || align=right | 102 km || 
|-id=832 bgcolor=#C2E0FF
| 500832 ||  || — || April 4, 2013 || Mauna Kea || OSSOS || SDO || align=right | 102 km || 
|-id=833 bgcolor=#C2E0FF
| 500833 ||  || — || April 4, 2013 || Mauna Kea || OSSOS || plutinocritical || align=right | 97 km || 
|-id=834 bgcolor=#C2E0FF
| 500834 ||  || — || April 9, 2013 || Mauna Kea || OSSOS || plutinocritical || align=right | 161 km || 
|-id=835 bgcolor=#C2E0FF
| 500835 ||  || — || April 4, 2013 || Mauna Kea || OSSOS || cubewano (cold) || align=right | 176 km || 
|-id=836 bgcolor=#C2E0FF
| 500836 ||  || — || April 4, 2013 || Mauna Kea || OSSOS || cubewano (cold)critical || align=right | 147 km || 
|-id=837 bgcolor=#C2E0FF
| 500837 ||  || — || April 9, 2013 || Mauna Kea || OSSOS || cubewano (cold) || align=right | 147 km || 
|-id=838 bgcolor=#C2E0FF
| 500838 ||  || — || April 9, 2013 || Mauna Kea || OSSOS || cubewano (cold)critical || align=right | 193 km || 
|-id=839 bgcolor=#C2E0FF
| 500839 ||  || — || April 9, 2013 || Mauna Kea || OSSOS || cubewano (hot)critical || align=right | 128 km || 
|-id=840 bgcolor=#C2E0FF
| 500840 ||  || — || April 9, 2013 || Mauna Kea || OSSOS || cubewano (cold)critical || align=right | 122 km || 
|-id=841 bgcolor=#fefefe
| 500841 ||  || — || September 4, 2010 || Mount Lemmon || Mount Lemmon Survey ||  || align=right data-sort-value="0.65" | 650 m || 
|-id=842 bgcolor=#fefefe
| 500842 ||  || — || April 9, 2013 || Haleakala || Pan-STARRS ||  || align=right data-sort-value="0.46" | 460 m || 
|-id=843 bgcolor=#fefefe
| 500843 ||  || — || November 11, 2004 || Kitt Peak || Spacewatch ||  || align=right data-sort-value="0.54" | 540 m || 
|-id=844 bgcolor=#fefefe
| 500844 ||  || — || October 11, 2007 || Kitt Peak || Spacewatch ||  || align=right data-sort-value="0.48" | 480 m || 
|-id=845 bgcolor=#fefefe
| 500845 ||  || — || October 24, 2011 || Haleakala || Pan-STARRS ||  || align=right data-sort-value="0.53" | 530 m || 
|-id=846 bgcolor=#fefefe
| 500846 ||  || — || January 31, 2006 || Kitt Peak || Spacewatch ||  || align=right data-sort-value="0.59" | 590 m || 
|-id=847 bgcolor=#fefefe
| 500847 ||  || — || April 9, 2013 || Haleakala || Pan-STARRS ||  || align=right data-sort-value="0.73" | 730 m || 
|-id=848 bgcolor=#fefefe
| 500848 ||  || — || November 21, 2008 || Mount Lemmon || Mount Lemmon Survey ||  || align=right data-sort-value="0.39" | 390 m || 
|-id=849 bgcolor=#fefefe
| 500849 ||  || — || June 14, 2010 || Mount Lemmon || Mount Lemmon Survey ||  || align=right data-sort-value="0.65" | 650 m || 
|-id=850 bgcolor=#fefefe
| 500850 ||  || — || May 22, 2006 || Kitt Peak || Spacewatch ||  || align=right data-sort-value="0.51" | 510 m || 
|-id=851 bgcolor=#fefefe
| 500851 ||  || — || October 10, 2007 || Mount Lemmon || Mount Lemmon Survey ||  || align=right data-sort-value="0.61" | 610 m || 
|-id=852 bgcolor=#fefefe
| 500852 ||  || — || April 9, 2013 || Haleakala || Pan-STARRS ||  || align=right data-sort-value="0.54" | 540 m || 
|-id=853 bgcolor=#fefefe
| 500853 ||  || — || April 10, 2013 || Haleakala || Pan-STARRS ||  || align=right data-sort-value="0.68" | 680 m || 
|-id=854 bgcolor=#fefefe
| 500854 ||  || — || October 24, 2011 || Haleakala || Pan-STARRS ||  || align=right data-sort-value="0.72" | 720 m || 
|-id=855 bgcolor=#fefefe
| 500855 ||  || — || November 1, 2008 || Mount Lemmon || Mount Lemmon Survey ||  || align=right data-sort-value="0.53" | 530 m || 
|-id=856 bgcolor=#C2E0FF
| 500856 ||  || — || April 19, 2013 || Mauna Kea || OSSOS || cubewano (cold)critical || align=right | 134 km || 
|-id=857 bgcolor=#fefefe
| 500857 ||  || — || February 19, 2009 || Kitt Peak || Spacewatch || MAS || align=right data-sort-value="0.63" | 630 m || 
|-id=858 bgcolor=#fefefe
| 500858 ||  || — || April 9, 2013 || Haleakala || Pan-STARRS ||  || align=right data-sort-value="0.55" | 550 m || 
|-id=859 bgcolor=#fefefe
| 500859 ||  || — || March 3, 2009 || Mount Lemmon || Mount Lemmon Survey ||  || align=right data-sort-value="0.66" | 660 m || 
|-id=860 bgcolor=#fefefe
| 500860 ||  || — || May 6, 2006 || Kitt Peak || Spacewatch || (2076) || align=right data-sort-value="0.57" | 570 m || 
|-id=861 bgcolor=#fefefe
| 500861 ||  || — || March 17, 2013 || Mount Lemmon || Mount Lemmon Survey ||  || align=right data-sort-value="0.75" | 750 m || 
|-id=862 bgcolor=#fefefe
| 500862 ||  || — || April 15, 2013 || Haleakala || Pan-STARRS ||  || align=right data-sort-value="0.71" | 710 m || 
|-id=863 bgcolor=#fefefe
| 500863 ||  || — || April 15, 2013 || Haleakala || Pan-STARRS ||  || align=right data-sort-value="0.71" | 710 m || 
|-id=864 bgcolor=#E9E9E9
| 500864 ||  || — || April 10, 2013 || Kitt Peak || Spacewatch ||  || align=right | 1.1 km || 
|-id=865 bgcolor=#fefefe
| 500865 ||  || — || May 9, 2013 || Siding Spring || SSS ||  || align=right | 1.1 km || 
|-id=866 bgcolor=#fefefe
| 500866 ||  || — || October 2, 2010 || Kitt Peak || Spacewatch ||  || align=right data-sort-value="0.55" | 550 m || 
|-id=867 bgcolor=#fefefe
| 500867 ||  || — || April 15, 2013 || Haleakala || Pan-STARRS ||  || align=right data-sort-value="0.64" | 640 m || 
|-id=868 bgcolor=#fefefe
| 500868 ||  || — || March 23, 2006 || Kitt Peak || Spacewatch ||  || align=right data-sort-value="0.59" | 590 m || 
|-id=869 bgcolor=#fefefe
| 500869 ||  || — || January 26, 2012 || Haleakala || Pan-STARRS ||  || align=right data-sort-value="0.72" | 720 m || 
|-id=870 bgcolor=#fefefe
| 500870 ||  || — || April 7, 2003 || Kitt Peak || Spacewatch ||  || align=right data-sort-value="0.62" | 620 m || 
|-id=871 bgcolor=#d6d6d6
| 500871 ||  || — || January 16, 2013 || Haleakala || Pan-STARRS ||  || align=right | 3.0 km || 
|-id=872 bgcolor=#fefefe
| 500872 ||  || — || September 14, 2010 || La Sagra || OAM Obs. || MAS || align=right data-sort-value="0.67" | 670 m || 
|-id=873 bgcolor=#fefefe
| 500873 ||  || — || April 8, 2013 || Mount Lemmon || Mount Lemmon Survey ||  || align=right data-sort-value="0.57" | 570 m || 
|-id=874 bgcolor=#fefefe
| 500874 ||  || — || April 13, 2013 || Haleakala || Pan-STARRS ||  || align=right data-sort-value="0.68" | 680 m || 
|-id=875 bgcolor=#fefefe
| 500875 ||  || — || January 16, 2009 || Kitt Peak || Spacewatch ||  || align=right data-sort-value="0.62" | 620 m || 
|-id=876 bgcolor=#C2E0FF
| 500876 ||  || — || May 8, 2013 || Mauna Kea || OSSOS || SDOcritical || align=right | 111 km || 
|-id=877 bgcolor=#C2E0FF
| 500877 ||  || — || May 7, 2013 || Mauna Kea || OSSOS || twotino || align=right | 102 km || 
|-id=878 bgcolor=#C2E0FF
| 500878 ||  || — || May 7, 2013 || Mauna Kea || OSSOS || other TNOcritical || align=right | 128 km || 
|-id=879 bgcolor=#C2E0FF
| 500879 ||  || — || May 7, 2013 || Mauna Kea || OSSOS || res4:11critical || align=right | 301 km || 
|-id=880 bgcolor=#C2E0FF
| 500880 ||  || — || May 7, 2013 || Mauna Kea || OSSOS || twotinocritical || align=right | 143 km || 
|-id=881 bgcolor=#C2E0FF
| 500881 ||  || — || May 8, 2013 || Mauna Kea || OSSOS || cubewano?critical || align=right | 102 km || 
|-id=882 bgcolor=#C2E0FF
| 500882 ||  || — || May 8, 2013 || Mauna Kea || OSSOS || res3:7critical || align=right | 97 km || 
|-id=883 bgcolor=#C2E0FF
| 500883 ||  || — || May 8, 2013 || Mauna Kea || OSSOS || plutinocritical || align=right | 147 km || 
|-id=884 bgcolor=#C2E0FF
| 500884 ||  || — || May 8, 2013 || Mauna Kea || OSSOS || plutinocritical || align=right | 53 km || 
|-id=885 bgcolor=#C2E0FF
| 500885 ||  || — || May 8, 2013 || Mauna Kea || OSSOS || plutinocritical || align=right | 70 km || 
|-id=886 bgcolor=#C2E0FF
| 500886 ||  || — || May 7, 2013 || Mauna Kea || OSSOS || other TNO || align=right | 147 km || 
|-id=887 bgcolor=#C2E0FF
| 500887 ||  || — || May 7, 2013 || Mauna Kea || OSSOS || cubewano?critical || align=right | 102 km || 
|-id=888 bgcolor=#C2E0FF
| 500888 ||  || — || May 7, 2013 || Mauna Kea || OSSOS || cubewano (hot)critical || align=right | 111 km || 
|-id=889 bgcolor=#fefefe
| 500889 ||  || — || May 16, 2013 || Haleakala || Pan-STARRS ||  || align=right data-sort-value="0.85" | 850 m || 
|-id=890 bgcolor=#fefefe
| 500890 ||  || — || April 15, 2013 || Haleakala || Pan-STARRS ||  || align=right data-sort-value="0.66" | 660 m || 
|-id=891 bgcolor=#fefefe
| 500891 ||  || — || May 17, 2013 || Mount Lemmon || Mount Lemmon Survey ||  || align=right data-sort-value="0.67" | 670 m || 
|-id=892 bgcolor=#fefefe
| 500892 ||  || — || August 9, 2010 || WISE || WISE ||  || align=right data-sort-value="0.60" | 600 m || 
|-id=893 bgcolor=#fefefe
| 500893 ||  || — || May 16, 2013 || Haleakala || Pan-STARRS ||  || align=right data-sort-value="0.64" | 640 m || 
|-id=894 bgcolor=#fefefe
| 500894 ||  || — || November 2, 2010 || Mount Lemmon || Mount Lemmon Survey ||  || align=right data-sort-value="0.62" | 620 m || 
|-id=895 bgcolor=#fefefe
| 500895 ||  || — || May 16, 2013 || Haleakala || Pan-STARRS ||  || align=right data-sort-value="0.52" | 520 m || 
|-id=896 bgcolor=#fefefe
| 500896 ||  || — || April 15, 2013 || Haleakala || Pan-STARRS ||  || align=right data-sort-value="0.73" | 730 m || 
|-id=897 bgcolor=#fefefe
| 500897 ||  || — || March 3, 2009 || Kitt Peak || Spacewatch ||  || align=right data-sort-value="0.55" | 550 m || 
|-id=898 bgcolor=#E9E9E9
| 500898 ||  || — || December 14, 2006 || Kitt Peak || Spacewatch ||  || align=right | 1.5 km || 
|-id=899 bgcolor=#fefefe
| 500899 ||  || — || April 15, 2013 || Haleakala || Pan-STARRS ||  || align=right data-sort-value="0.79" | 790 m || 
|-id=900 bgcolor=#fefefe
| 500900 ||  || — || August 21, 2006 || Kitt Peak || Spacewatch ||  || align=right data-sort-value="0.74" | 740 m || 
|}

500901–501000 

|-bgcolor=#fefefe
| 500901 ||  || — || June 18, 2013 || Mount Lemmon || Mount Lemmon Survey ||  || align=right data-sort-value="0.75" | 750 m || 
|-id=902 bgcolor=#fefefe
| 500902 ||  || — || June 19, 2013 || Mount Lemmon || Mount Lemmon Survey ||  || align=right data-sort-value="0.72" | 720 m || 
|-id=903 bgcolor=#fefefe
| 500903 ||  || — || October 30, 2010 || Mount Lemmon || Mount Lemmon Survey || NYS || align=right data-sort-value="0.54" | 540 m || 
|-id=904 bgcolor=#E9E9E9
| 500904 ||  || — || November 4, 2010 || Mount Lemmon || Mount Lemmon Survey || MAR || align=right | 1.5 km || 
|-id=905 bgcolor=#fefefe
| 500905 ||  || — || February 27, 2009 || Kitt Peak || Spacewatch ||  || align=right data-sort-value="0.76" | 760 m || 
|-id=906 bgcolor=#fefefe
| 500906 ||  || — || April 30, 2009 || Kitt Peak || Spacewatch || MAS || align=right data-sort-value="0.59" | 590 m || 
|-id=907 bgcolor=#fefefe
| 500907 ||  || — || November 8, 2010 || Mount Lemmon || Mount Lemmon Survey ||  || align=right data-sort-value="0.57" | 570 m || 
|-id=908 bgcolor=#fefefe
| 500908 ||  || — || August 28, 2006 || Kitt Peak || Spacewatch ||  || align=right data-sort-value="0.77" | 770 m || 
|-id=909 bgcolor=#fefefe
| 500909 ||  || — || July 1, 2013 || Haleakala || Pan-STARRS ||  || align=right data-sort-value="0.67" | 670 m || 
|-id=910 bgcolor=#d6d6d6
| 500910 ||  || — || October 31, 2008 || Mount Lemmon || Mount Lemmon Survey || YAK || align=right | 3.0 km || 
|-id=911 bgcolor=#E9E9E9
| 500911 ||  || — || August 23, 2001 || Anderson Mesa || LONEOS ||  || align=right | 1.1 km || 
|-id=912 bgcolor=#FA8072
| 500912 ||  || — || July 8, 2005 || Kitt Peak || Spacewatch ||  || align=right data-sort-value="0.67" | 670 m || 
|-id=913 bgcolor=#fefefe
| 500913 ||  || — || July 2, 2013 || Haleakala || Pan-STARRS ||  || align=right data-sort-value="0.82" | 820 m || 
|-id=914 bgcolor=#fefefe
| 500914 ||  || — || June 23, 2009 || Mount Lemmon || Mount Lemmon Survey ||  || align=right | 1.2 km || 
|-id=915 bgcolor=#fefefe
| 500915 ||  || — || August 3, 2013 || Haleakala || Pan-STARRS ||  || align=right data-sort-value="0.78" | 780 m || 
|-id=916 bgcolor=#E9E9E9
| 500916 ||  || — || September 12, 2001 || Socorro || LINEAR ||  || align=right data-sort-value="0.86" | 860 m || 
|-id=917 bgcolor=#E9E9E9
| 500917 ||  || — || October 14, 2009 || Mount Lemmon || Mount Lemmon Survey ||  || align=right | 1.5 km || 
|-id=918 bgcolor=#E9E9E9
| 500918 ||  || — || September 19, 2001 || Socorro || LINEAR ||  || align=right data-sort-value="0.66" | 660 m || 
|-id=919 bgcolor=#fefefe
| 500919 ||  || — || June 20, 2013 || Haleakala || Pan-STARRS ||  || align=right data-sort-value="0.79" | 790 m || 
|-id=920 bgcolor=#E9E9E9
| 500920 ||  || — || August 26, 2009 || Catalina || CSS ||  || align=right | 1.7 km || 
|-id=921 bgcolor=#E9E9E9
| 500921 ||  || — || December 25, 2005 || Mount Lemmon || Mount Lemmon Survey || (1547)  IAN || align=right | 1.8 km || 
|-id=922 bgcolor=#FFC2E0
| 500922 ||  || — || August 8, 2013 || Haleakala || Pan-STARRS || APO +1km || align=right data-sort-value="0.97" | 970 m || 
|-id=923 bgcolor=#E9E9E9
| 500923 ||  || — || August 9, 2013 || Haleakala || Pan-STARRS ||  || align=right | 1.1 km || 
|-id=924 bgcolor=#fefefe
| 500924 ||  || — || February 27, 2012 || Haleakala || Pan-STARRS ||  || align=right data-sort-value="0.95" | 950 m || 
|-id=925 bgcolor=#E9E9E9
| 500925 ||  || — || January 30, 2011 || Haleakala || Pan-STARRS ||  || align=right | 1.4 km || 
|-id=926 bgcolor=#fefefe
| 500926 ||  || — || February 13, 2012 || Haleakala || Pan-STARRS ||  || align=right | 1.0 km || 
|-id=927 bgcolor=#fefefe
| 500927 ||  || — || July 28, 2009 || Kitt Peak || Spacewatch ||  || align=right data-sort-value="0.64" | 640 m || 
|-id=928 bgcolor=#fefefe
| 500928 ||  || — || August 9, 2013 || Kitt Peak || Spacewatch ||  || align=right data-sort-value="0.67" | 670 m || 
|-id=929 bgcolor=#fefefe
| 500929 ||  || — || December 5, 2010 || Mount Lemmon || Mount Lemmon Survey ||  || align=right data-sort-value="0.73" | 730 m || 
|-id=930 bgcolor=#E9E9E9
| 500930 ||  || — || September 29, 2005 || Kitt Peak || Spacewatch ||  || align=right data-sort-value="0.71" | 710 m || 
|-id=931 bgcolor=#E9E9E9
| 500931 ||  || — || January 30, 2011 || Haleakala || Pan-STARRS ||  || align=right data-sort-value="0.69" | 690 m || 
|-id=932 bgcolor=#E9E9E9
| 500932 ||  || — || April 24, 2012 || Kitt Peak || Spacewatch ||  || align=right | 1.8 km || 
|-id=933 bgcolor=#E9E9E9
| 500933 ||  || — || August 16, 2009 || Kitt Peak || Spacewatch ||  || align=right data-sort-value="0.83" | 830 m || 
|-id=934 bgcolor=#E9E9E9
| 500934 ||  || — || August 9, 2013 || Haleakala || Pan-STARRS ||  || align=right | 1.1 km || 
|-id=935 bgcolor=#E9E9E9
| 500935 ||  || — || August 12, 2013 || Kitt Peak || Spacewatch || EUN || align=right data-sort-value="0.74" | 740 m || 
|-id=936 bgcolor=#fefefe
| 500936 ||  || — || July 15, 2013 || Haleakala || Pan-STARRS ||  || align=right data-sort-value="0.68" | 680 m || 
|-id=937 bgcolor=#E9E9E9
| 500937 ||  || — || July 15, 2013 || Haleakala || Pan-STARRS ||  || align=right data-sort-value="0.76" | 760 m || 
|-id=938 bgcolor=#fefefe
| 500938 ||  || — || August 15, 2009 || La Sagra || OAM Obs. ||  || align=right data-sort-value="0.76" | 760 m || 
|-id=939 bgcolor=#fefefe
| 500939 ||  || — || November 21, 2006 || Mount Lemmon || Mount Lemmon Survey ||  || align=right data-sort-value="0.96" | 960 m || 
|-id=940 bgcolor=#E9E9E9
| 500940 ||  || — || August 28, 2009 || Kitt Peak || Spacewatch ||  || align=right data-sort-value="0.69" | 690 m || 
|-id=941 bgcolor=#E9E9E9
| 500941 ||  || — || March 1, 2010 || WISE || WISE ||  || align=right | 2.0 km || 
|-id=942 bgcolor=#E9E9E9
| 500942 ||  || — || September 20, 2001 || Socorro || LINEAR ||  || align=right data-sort-value="0.61" | 610 m || 
|-id=943 bgcolor=#E9E9E9
| 500943 ||  || — || September 25, 2009 || Catalina || CSS || EUN || align=right | 1.1 km || 
|-id=944 bgcolor=#fefefe
| 500944 ||  || — || July 19, 2009 || La Sagra || OAM Obs. || NYS || align=right data-sort-value="0.68" | 680 m || 
|-id=945 bgcolor=#E9E9E9
| 500945 ||  || — || December 31, 2005 || Kitt Peak || Spacewatch ||  || align=right | 1.4 km || 
|-id=946 bgcolor=#fefefe
| 500946 ||  || — || June 20, 2013 || Haleakala || Pan-STARRS ||  || align=right data-sort-value="0.68" | 680 m || 
|-id=947 bgcolor=#E9E9E9
| 500947 ||  || — || October 28, 2005 || Kitt Peak || Spacewatch ||  || align=right data-sort-value="0.99" | 990 m || 
|-id=948 bgcolor=#E9E9E9
| 500948 ||  || — || January 30, 2011 || Haleakala || Pan-STARRS ||  || align=right | 1.4 km || 
|-id=949 bgcolor=#E9E9E9
| 500949 ||  || — || March 6, 1994 || Kitt Peak || Spacewatch || BAR || align=right | 1.0 km || 
|-id=950 bgcolor=#E9E9E9
| 500950 ||  || — || August 28, 2013 || Haleakala || Pan-STARRS ||  || align=right | 1.4 km || 
|-id=951 bgcolor=#fefefe
| 500951 ||  || — || January 19, 2012 || Haleakala || Pan-STARRS || NYS || align=right data-sort-value="0.72" | 720 m || 
|-id=952 bgcolor=#E9E9E9
| 500952 ||  || — || August 8, 2013 || Kitt Peak || Spacewatch ||  || align=right | 1.0 km || 
|-id=953 bgcolor=#E9E9E9
| 500953 ||  || — || October 24, 2005 || Kitt Peak || Spacewatch ||  || align=right | 1.0 km || 
|-id=954 bgcolor=#fefefe
| 500954 ||  || — || August 29, 2013 || Haleakala || Pan-STARRS ||  || align=right data-sort-value="0.78" | 780 m || 
|-id=955 bgcolor=#fefefe
| 500955 ||  || — || August 26, 2013 || Haleakala || Pan-STARRS || LCI || align=right | 1.1 km || 
|-id=956 bgcolor=#E9E9E9
| 500956 ||  || — || August 12, 2013 || Haleakala || Pan-STARRS ||  || align=right data-sort-value="0.80" | 800 m || 
|-id=957 bgcolor=#fefefe
| 500957 ||  || — || February 5, 2011 || Haleakala || Pan-STARRS ||  || align=right data-sort-value="0.69" | 690 m || 
|-id=958 bgcolor=#E9E9E9
| 500958 ||  || — || August 18, 2009 || Kitt Peak || Spacewatch ||  || align=right data-sort-value="0.71" | 710 m || 
|-id=959 bgcolor=#E9E9E9
| 500959 ||  || — || January 30, 2011 || Haleakala || Pan-STARRS ||  || align=right | 1.2 km || 
|-id=960 bgcolor=#E9E9E9
| 500960 ||  || — || December 22, 2005 || Catalina || CSS ||  || align=right | 2.1 km || 
|-id=961 bgcolor=#fefefe
| 500961 ||  || — || February 24, 2012 || Haleakala || Pan-STARRS ||  || align=right data-sort-value="0.74" | 740 m || 
|-id=962 bgcolor=#fefefe
| 500962 ||  || — || July 27, 2009 || Kitt Peak || Spacewatch || MAS || align=right data-sort-value="0.64" | 640 m || 
|-id=963 bgcolor=#E9E9E9
| 500963 ||  || — || August 30, 2005 || Kitt Peak || Spacewatch ||  || align=right data-sort-value="0.58" | 580 m || 
|-id=964 bgcolor=#E9E9E9
| 500964 ||  || — || November 8, 2009 || Catalina || CSS ||  || align=right | 1.7 km || 
|-id=965 bgcolor=#E9E9E9
| 500965 ||  || — || September 19, 2009 || Kitt Peak || Spacewatch ||  || align=right | 1.1 km || 
|-id=966 bgcolor=#fefefe
| 500966 ||  || — || May 4, 2005 || Catalina || CSS ||  || align=right data-sort-value="0.85" | 850 m || 
|-id=967 bgcolor=#fefefe
| 500967 ||  || — || June 21, 2013 || Mount Lemmon || Mount Lemmon Survey ||  || align=right data-sort-value="0.84" | 840 m || 
|-id=968 bgcolor=#E9E9E9
| 500968 ||  || — || October 30, 2005 || Kitt Peak || Spacewatch ||  || align=right data-sort-value="0.71" | 710 m || 
|-id=969 bgcolor=#fefefe
| 500969 ||  || — || August 8, 2013 || Kitt Peak || Spacewatch ||  || align=right data-sort-value="0.70" | 700 m || 
|-id=970 bgcolor=#fefefe
| 500970 ||  || — || July 8, 2013 || Siding Spring || SSS || NYS || align=right data-sort-value="0.76" | 760 m || 
|-id=971 bgcolor=#E9E9E9
| 500971 ||  || — || March 26, 2007 || Mount Lemmon || Mount Lemmon Survey ||  || align=right data-sort-value="0.96" | 960 m || 
|-id=972 bgcolor=#fefefe
| 500972 ||  || — || January 30, 2011 || Haleakala || Pan-STARRS ||  || align=right data-sort-value="0.82" | 820 m || 
|-id=973 bgcolor=#fefefe
| 500973 ||  || — || May 10, 2005 || Kitt Peak || Spacewatch ||  || align=right data-sort-value="0.81" | 810 m || 
|-id=974 bgcolor=#E9E9E9
| 500974 ||  || — || October 14, 2009 || Catalina || CSS ||  || align=right data-sort-value="0.92" | 920 m || 
|-id=975 bgcolor=#E9E9E9
| 500975 ||  || — || August 8, 2013 || Kitt Peak || Spacewatch ||  || align=right | 1.3 km || 
|-id=976 bgcolor=#E9E9E9
| 500976 ||  || — || August 12, 2013 || Kitt Peak || Spacewatch ||  || align=right data-sort-value="0.64" | 640 m || 
|-id=977 bgcolor=#E9E9E9
| 500977 ||  || — || August 12, 2013 || Haleakala || Pan-STARRS || ADE || align=right | 1.4 km || 
|-id=978 bgcolor=#E9E9E9
| 500978 ||  || — || September 18, 2009 || Catalina || CSS ||  || align=right | 1.8 km || 
|-id=979 bgcolor=#E9E9E9
| 500979 ||  || — || October 26, 2005 || Kitt Peak || Spacewatch ||  || align=right data-sort-value="0.73" | 730 m || 
|-id=980 bgcolor=#fefefe
| 500980 ||  || — || March 16, 2012 || Haleakala || Pan-STARRS ||  || align=right | 1.0 km || 
|-id=981 bgcolor=#E9E9E9
| 500981 ||  || — || April 27, 2012 || Haleakala || Pan-STARRS ||  || align=right data-sort-value="0.79" | 790 m || 
|-id=982 bgcolor=#E9E9E9
| 500982 ||  || — || July 15, 2013 || Haleakala || Pan-STARRS ||  || align=right data-sort-value="0.96" | 960 m || 
|-id=983 bgcolor=#E9E9E9
| 500983 ||  || — || August 9, 2013 || Catalina || CSS ||  || align=right data-sort-value="0.70" | 700 m || 
|-id=984 bgcolor=#E9E9E9
| 500984 ||  || — || March 31, 2011 || Haleakala || Pan-STARRS ||  || align=right | 2.2 km || 
|-id=985 bgcolor=#E9E9E9
| 500985 ||  || — || October 18, 2009 || Mount Lemmon || Mount Lemmon Survey ||  || align=right | 1.2 km || 
|-id=986 bgcolor=#E9E9E9
| 500986 ||  || — || September 19, 2009 || Kitt Peak || Spacewatch ||  || align=right data-sort-value="0.62" | 620 m || 
|-id=987 bgcolor=#E9E9E9
| 500987 ||  || — || August 15, 2013 || Haleakala || Pan-STARRS || AGN || align=right | 1.0 km || 
|-id=988 bgcolor=#E9E9E9
| 500988 ||  || — || September 17, 2009 || Kitt Peak || Spacewatch ||  || align=right | 1.2 km || 
|-id=989 bgcolor=#E9E9E9
| 500989 ||  || — || September 28, 2009 || Kitt Peak || Spacewatch ||  || align=right data-sort-value="0.54" | 540 m || 
|-id=990 bgcolor=#E9E9E9
| 500990 ||  || — || March 30, 2008 || Kitt Peak || Spacewatch ||  || align=right | 1.2 km || 
|-id=991 bgcolor=#E9E9E9
| 500991 ||  || — || August 15, 2013 || Haleakala || Pan-STARRS ||  || align=right data-sort-value="0.73" | 730 m || 
|-id=992 bgcolor=#E9E9E9
| 500992 ||  || — || September 21, 2009 || Kitt Peak || Spacewatch ||  || align=right | 1.00 km || 
|-id=993 bgcolor=#E9E9E9
| 500993 ||  || — || August 28, 2013 || Catalina || CSS ||  || align=right data-sort-value="0.78" | 780 m || 
|-id=994 bgcolor=#fefefe
| 500994 ||  || — || August 14, 2013 || Haleakala || Pan-STARRS ||  || align=right data-sort-value="0.85" | 850 m || 
|-id=995 bgcolor=#E9E9E9
| 500995 ||  || — || September 1, 2013 || Mount Lemmon || Mount Lemmon Survey || WIT || align=right | 2.0 km || 
|-id=996 bgcolor=#E9E9E9
| 500996 ||  || — || November 9, 2009 || Socorro || LINEAR ||  || align=right | 2.0 km || 
|-id=997 bgcolor=#E9E9E9
| 500997 ||  || — || January 30, 2011 || Haleakala || Pan-STARRS ||  || align=right | 1.5 km || 
|-id=998 bgcolor=#fefefe
| 500998 ||  || — || April 27, 2012 || Haleakala || Pan-STARRS ||  || align=right data-sort-value="0.79" | 790 m || 
|-id=999 bgcolor=#E9E9E9
| 500999 ||  || — || April 3, 2011 || Haleakala || Pan-STARRS || EUN || align=right | 1.2 km || 
|-id=000 bgcolor=#E9E9E9
| 501000 ||  || — || February 5, 2010 || WISE || WISE ||  || align=right | 2.4 km || 
|}

References

External links 
 Discovery Circumstances: Numbered Minor Planets (500001)–(505000) (IAU Minor Planet Center)

0500